Romance of the Three Kingdoms is a 14th-century historical novel attributed to Luo Guanzhong. It is set in the turbulent years towards the end of the Han dynasty and the Three Kingdoms period in Chinese history, starting in 184 AD and ending with the reunification of the land in 280 by Western Jin. The novel is based primarily on the Records of the Three Kingdoms, written by Chen Shou.

The story – part historical and part fictional – romanticises and dramatises the lives of feudal lords and their retainers, who tried to replace the dwindling Han dynasty or restore it. While the novel follows hundreds of characters, the focus is mainly on the three power blocs that emerged from the remnants of the Han dynasty, and would eventually form the three states of Cao Wei, Shu Han, and Eastern Wu. The novel deals with the plots, personal and military battles, intrigues, and struggles of these states to achieve dominance for almost 100 years.

Romance of the Three Kingdoms is acclaimed as one of the Four Great Classical Novels of Chinese literature; it has a total of 800,000 words and nearly a thousand dramatic characters (mostly historical) in 120 chapters. The novel is among the most beloved works of literature in East Asia, and its literary influence in the region has been compared to that of the works of Shakespeare on English literature. It is arguably the most widely read historical novel in late imperial and modern China. Herbert Giles stated that among the Chinese themselves, this is regarded as the greatest of all their novels.

Origins and versions
Stories about the heroes of the Three Kingdoms were the basis of entertainment dating back to the Sui and Tang dynasty (6th–10th centuries). By the Song dynasty (10th–13th centuries), there were several records of professional oral storytellers who specialized in the Three Kingdoms hero cycles.  The earliest written work to combine these stories was a pinghua, Sanguozhi Pinghua, published sometime between 1321 and 1323.

Expansion of the history
Romance of the Three Kingdoms is traditionally attributed to Luo Guanzhong, a playwright who lived sometime between 1315 and 1400 (late Yuan to early Ming period) known for compiling historical plays in styles which were prevalent during the Yuan period. It was first printed in 1522 as Sanguozhi Tongsu Yanyi (三國志通俗演義/三国志通俗演义) in an edition which bore a preface dated 1494. The text may well have circulated before either date in handwritten manuscripts.

Regardless of when it was written or whether Luo was the writer, the author made use of several available historical records, primarily the Records of the Three Kingdoms compiled by Chen Shou. The Records of the Three Kingdoms covered events ranging from the Yellow Turban Rebellion in 184 to the unification of the Three Kingdoms under the Jin dynasty in 280. The novel also includes material from Tang dynasty poetic works, Yuan dynasty operas and his own personal interpretation of elements such as virtue and legitimacy. The author combined this historical knowledge with his own storytelling skills to create a rich tapestry of personalities.

Recensions and standardised text
Several versions of the expanded Sanguozhi are extant today. Luo Guanzhong's version in 24 volumes, known as the Sanguozhi Tongsu Yanyi, is now held in the Shanghai Library in China, Tenri Central Library in Japan, and several other major libraries. Various 10-volume, 12-volume and 20-volume recensions of Luo's text, made between 1522 and 1690, are also held at libraries around the world. However, the standard text familiar to general readers is a recension by Mao Lun and his son Mao Zonggang.

In the 1660s, during the reign of the Kangxi Emperor in the Qing dynasty, Mao Lun and Mao Zonggang significantly edited the text, fitting it into 120 chapters, and abbreviating the title to Sanguozhi Yanyi. The text was reduced from 900,000 to 750,000 characters; significant editing was done for narrative flow; use of third-party poems was reduced and shifted from conventional verse to finer pieces; and most passages praising Cao Cao's advisers and generals were removed. Scholars have long debated whether the Maos' viewpoint was anti-Qing (identifying Southern Ming remnants with Shu-Han) or pro-Qing.

The famous opening lines of the novel, "The empire, long divided, must unite; long united, must divide. Thus it has ever been" (話說天下大勢．分久必合，合久必分 Huàshuō tiānxià dàshì. Fēnjiǔbìhé, hé jiǔ bì fēn), long understood to be Luo's introduction and cyclical philosophy, were actually added by the Maos in their substantially revised edition of 1679. None of the earlier editions contained this phrase. In addition, Mao also added Yang Shen's The Immortals by the River as the famous introductory poem (which began with "The gushing waters of the Yangzi River pour and disappear into the East") (滾滾長江東逝水) to the novel. The earlier editions, moreover, spend less time on the process of division, which they found painful, and far more time on the process of reunification and the struggles of the heroes who sacrificed for it.

Storyline
One of the greatest achievements of Romance of the Three Kingdoms is the extreme complexity of its stories and characters. The novel contains numerous subplots. The following consists of a summary of the central plot and some well-known highlights in the novel.

Oath of the Peach Garden
During the final years of the Eastern Han dynasty, treacherous eunuchs and villainous officials deceived the emperor and persecuted good officials. The government gradually became extremely corrupt on all levels, leading to widespread deterioration of the Han Empire. One of the eunuchs, Zhang Rang, was so influential that the Emperor even called him Daddy. During the reign of Emperor Ling, the Yellow Turban Rebellion broke out under the leadership of Zhang Jiao and his two brothers Bao and Liang.

Zhang Jiao was an unclassified grad who devoted himself to medicine. One day, he saw an old man in a cave who gave him three volumes of the "Book of Heaven". He studied it day and night and could summon winds and command the rain. Thus, when a terrible pestilence ran through the land, Zhang Jiao started handing out remedies. He then started having disciples and started a Yellow Turban Rebellion. They, large in number, swept through many cities and were attacking You Province. The prefect, Liu Yan, set up posters creating a volunteer army.

In You Province, a man named Liu Bei saw a poster recruiting men who could join a volunteer army to suppress the Yellow Turban Rebellion. Liu Bei was of the Imperial Family, but his father died when he was young and he was very poor, living off selling straw sandals. He sighed, thinking that he could not do anything. When Liu Bei was young, he liked to make friends with the popular kids. Near his house was a giant tree, and a fortune teller once said that a boy who lives under that tree would become a great man.

A man named Zhang Fei heard the sigh and questioned Liu Bei furiously why he had sighed. Zhang Fei had a giant beard and was very tall. Zhang Fei was the local butcher and lived his life selling beer and meat. Liu Bei and Zhang Fei expressed their thoughts about wanting to join. United by a common cause, they went to the bar to drink and met another like-minded soul in Guan Yu. Guan Yu was taller than Zhang Fei, and Liu Bei instantly knew that Guan Yu was no ordinary man. Thus, he invited Guan Yu over. Guan Yu told them he wanted to serve the Han, and he had run away from his family after killing a family bully.

The three of them ate heartily and Zhang Fei suggested that they should go to the peach garden behind his house and become sworn brothers. The three of them then became sworn brothers. Due to their ages, Liu Bei became the eldest, Guan Yu the second and Zhang Fei the youngest. They all said, "We were not born on the same year of the same month of the same day but we pledge to die on the same year of the same month of the same day together. Whoever breaks the oath will die." Liu Bei, Zhang Fei and Guan Yu joined the army and got their weapons.

Zhang Fei thrashes the Imperial Inspector
Liu Bei, Guan Yu, and Zhang Fei defeated Zhang Jiao when he attacked his old master Lu Zhi. They saved Jing Province with a well planned ambush and the remnants were defeated by Cao Cao.

Cao Cao was a very playful boy who constantly stirred trouble. His uncle hated him and reported him to his father, who punished Cao Cao severely. Cao Cao then thought of a trick to continue his schemes. One day, he fainted on the floor, and his uncle rushed to tell his father. When the two arrived, they only saw Cao Cao playing a zither. Cao Song, Cao Cao's father stopped trusting the uncle. Cao Cao then continued his naughty ways.

At the same time, another general Sun Jian rose to fame. Sun Jian loved hunting. Once, he and his father pillaged a pirate ship and Sun Jian managed to kill one of the pirates.

Cao Cao started attacking Zhang Liang at Chuyang, and Zhang Liang was killed. Liu Bei had used counter magic learned from a general and defeated Zhang Bao. Shortly after, Zhang Jiao died and the rebellion was stopped. However, many uprisings still staged.

The three brothers had good success in suppressing the rebellion and they also saved the high-ranking official Dong Zhuo who looked down on them for they were not of high nobility. Zhang Fei wanted to kill him, but was controlled by his brothers.

The Emperor then promoted Cao Cao and Sun Jian. Lu Zhi recommended Liu Bei, and Liu Bei was given a minor office. However, the Emperor's advisors, the Eunuchs, threatened to remove several minor offices. So, the Imperial Inspector wanted to ask Liu Bei for a bribe, but Liu Bei rejected. Liu Bei was then asked to give a banquet, and Liu Bei gave a plate of fresh fruits and vegetables. The Imperial Inspector was dissatisfied and removed Liu Bei from his position.

Zhang Fei was vexed and he tied the Imperial Inspector to a wall and attacked him. Guan Yu helped Liu Bei escape from prison and the two brothers stopped Zhang Fei from continuing to assault the Imperial Inspector.

He Jin blunders and dies

In 189, Emperor Ling fell ill and sent He Jin to prepare for the future. He Jin belonged to a minor family of butchers, but his sister became a major concubine and He Jin grew in popularity.

Upon Emperor Ling's death, He Jin installed the young Emperor Shao on the throne and took control of the central government. The Ten Eunuchs, Cao Cao and Yuan Shao surmised, were the cause of trouble In the country.

He Jin was convinced by Yuan Shao and started to take action. First, he killed the Empress Dong to increase his popularity. During her funeral, He Jin feigned illness and did not attend. Cao Cao and Yuan Shao realised that He Jin was a man who could bring confusion to the empire.

He Jin then decided to bring Dong Zhuo's 30000 strong army to attack. The eunuchs, knowing they would be destroyed, held the Emperor and the Empress hostage. He Jin sent Cao Cao and Yuan Shao to guard the entrance of the Palace while he go in to kill the eunuchs. Zhang Rang, the head eunuch cornered him and called him a dirty traitor. He Jin, with no way to escape, was killed by the eunuchs.

Yuan Shao waited for a while, and suspected that He Jin was dead, so he made the announcement. He Jin's officer set fire to the gate. Four eunuchs were discovered and hacked to death. Lu Zhi nearly killed the eunuch Duan Gui and saved the Empress. Wu Kuang killed He Jin's brother He Miao, for the latter had been bribed by the eunuchs to kill He Jin. Yuan Shao's soldiers killed the families of the eunuchs. In that slaughter, countless beardless men were wrongly killed. Cao Cao worked to extinguish the flames.

Zhang Rang had been pursued by Yuan Shao, and knowing no escape, he drowned himself in a river. The Emperor and Prince Chenliu hid among the tall grass near the river bank and were found by a kind farmer, who gave them refreshments. Min Gong killed Duan Gui and found the Emperor and Prince Chenliu, so the two left the farm. The two boys returned to Luoyang.

Cao Cao presents a knife
The missing emperor and the prince were found by soldiers of the warlord Dong Zhuo, who seized control of the imperial capital, Luoyang, under the pretext of protecting the emperor. When the missing emperor cowered in fear at Dong Zhuo,  the prince ordered Dong Zhuo to kneel down and respect the emperor. Impressed by his bravery, Dong Zhuo later deposed Emperor Shao and replaced him with the Prince of Chenliu (Emperor Xian), who was merely a figurehead under his control. Dong Zhuo monopolized state power, persecuted his political opponents, and oppressed the common people for his gain. One of his opponents was Ding Yuan, who sent an army led by his godson Lü Bu to fight Dong Zhuo. Dong Zhuo was able to win Lü Bu over by giving him a horse named the Red Hare that was known for its speed.

When Dong Zhuo replaced the Emperor, an officer named Wu Fu was dissatisfied and attempted to murder Dong Zhuo, but the latter was able to hold him off until Lü Bu came to control him. Wu Fu was executed.

Senior Minister Wang Yun held a birthday party and invited many officials. Cao Cao was not invited but came on his own. Midway during the celebration, Wang Yun broke into tears and revealed that it was not his birthday, and he wanted to discuss how to kill Dong Zhuo without being discovered. He had cried out of sadness for the Emperor. Hearing this, Cao Cao laughed and asked for Wang Yun's seven star sword to cut Dong Zhuo's neck and hang it on the street. Wang Yun and the officials clapped and presented Cao Cao with the sword.

At night, Cao Cao pretended that his horse was slow and tired and he needed to borrow a horse. Dong Zhuo sent Lü Bu to get Cao Cao a horse and Dong Zhuo slept in the meantime. Cao Cao tried to cut Dong Zhuo's neck and run, but his attempt went awry went Dong Zhuo woke up and saw Cao Cao holding a knife in his mirror. Cao Cao instantly bowed down and presented the knife to Dong Zhuo, and when Lü Bu came back, he escaped. Dong Zhuo and Lü Bu realized Cao Cao was their enemy and they made him a wanted person.

Cao Cao flees from the capital
Cao Cao tried to disguise himself but an intelligent official named Chen Gong found him. Cao Cao was ready for a fight, but Chen Gong merely wanted to be Cao Cao's friend.

They resided in an old man's house. The old man went out to buy more wine during the night. Cao Cao mistakenly heard the sounds of a sword and was alarmed. He woke Chen Gong up and they both slew the entire family. When they escape from the house, they realised that the family was trying to kill a pig in their honor. Filled with grief, Chen Gong placed his sword down.

Just then, the old man arrived. Instinctively, Cao Cao killed the old man, panicking Chen Gong. When Cao Cao fell asleep in the forest, Chen Gong tried to kill Cao Cao. However, he realized that that would not look good on his record, so he left. Around this time, Cao Cao said his famous quote turned lie: “I would rather betray the world than let the world betray me.”

Guan Yu slays Hua Xiong over warm wine
Cao Cao escaped from Luoyang, returned to his hometown, and sent out a fake imperial edict to various regional officials and warlords, calling them to rise against Dong Zhuo. Under Yuan Shao's leadership, 18 warlords formed a coalition army and launched a punitive campaign against Dong Zhuo. Cao Cao also gained the generals Xiahou Dun, Xiahou Yuan, Li Dian and Yue Jin. One of the warlords, Gongsun Zan, passed by Liu Bei and learnt about his brothers. Gongsun Zan invited Liu Bei to help attack Dong Zhuo while Zhang Fei whined about how he should have killed Dong Zhuo last time.

Thus, the battle of Sishui Pass begins. Sun Jian started on the offensive, but was lured into an ambush and barely escaped, having to lose his cloak to make a diversion. Yuan Shu refused to send supplies to Sun Jian's camp as he feared that Sun Jian would become too powerful. Hence, Sun Jian had to retreat.

Dong Zhuo then sent Hua Xiong to strike Sun Jian as he was retreating. Yu She, belonging to Yuan Shu's train, volunteered to fight. However, he fell in the third bout. Pan Feng was the next to die. Yuan Shao moaned that he should have brought his major generals Yan Liang and Wen Chou with him.

When he asked for volunteers to fight Hua Xiong, Guan Yu was the first to step forward. Yuan Shao was offended that a low class officer could think that he is better than all the generals sent earlier, but Cao Cao convinced Yuan Shao to let Guan Yu have a shot. Cao Cao wanted to give him a glass of wine before the fight, but Guan Yu refused. Instead, he told Cao Cao he would kill Hua Xiong and be rewarded with the wine. When Guan Yu killed Hua Xiong, the wine was still warm. Guan Yu had impressed everybody. Dong Zhuo was upset over this failure. He then sent Li Jue and Guo Si to massacre the whole Yuan family. Sishui Pass had been lost so Dong Zhuo went to Hulao Pass.

Three brothers combined defeat Lü Bu
Hulao Pass was 50 li from Luoyang and Dong Zhuo bade Lü Bu make a strong stockade outside the pass, while Dong Zhuo and the main force will occupy the pass. News quickly came to Yuan Shao. Cao Cao suggested they oppose Dong Zhuo as  Dong Zhuo occupying the path would split the army in two.

Wang Kuang then sent Fang to attack Lü Bu. With his mighty halberd, he struck Fang down within five bouts. Indeed, he was the man among men, as his steed was the horse among horses. Lü Bu dashed forward and cut Wang Kuang's army down. He was quite irresistible.

Lü Bu then challenged the coalition for a fight. With no response, they attacked. Mu Shun, a leader, rode out, bit was tossed aside by Lü Bu and fell in the first bout. This frightened   others. Wu Anguo rode out with an iron mace, but his wrist was cut off by the tenth bout and he fled. Cao Cao remarked, "No one can stand a chance against Lü Bu, we must callup all the lords. If only Lü Bu died, Dong Zhuo would easily fall."

When all the lords came, Lü Bu challenged again. He was met by Gongsun Zan who drew out his spear. After very few bouts Gongsun Zan was worsted and turned to flee. Lü Bu on his Red Hare was launching the killing blow when Zhang Fei came, roaring, "Stay, O thrice named slave!" Zhang Fei had enraged Lü Bu so Lü Bu gave up chasing and turned to face Zhang Fei.

Lü Bu and Zhang Fei fought toe to toe for 50 bouts, with no one gaining a significant edge over the other. Thus, Guan Yu and Liu Bei joined the battle and Lü Bu. The continuous movement of the Three brothers caused Lü Bu to be dizzy, and he struggled to duel with them. Overcome by fatigue, he fled. The whole army cheered and dashed forward to pursue. The three brothers maintained the pursuit and Zhang Fei saw Dong Zhuo. However, stones and arrows fell and Zhang Fei retreated. Dong Zhuo eventually fled back to Luoyang. Sun Jian advanced forward and took Hulao Pass.

Sun Jian and Yuan Shao break faith for power
Dong Zhuo felt threatened after losing the battles of Sishui Pass and Hulao Pass, so he evacuated Luoyang and moved the imperial capital to Chang'an. He forced Luoyang's residents to move together with him and had the city set aflame.

Sun Jian pursued and defeated Lü Bu. His soldiers extinguished the flames that enveloped Luoyang. He found the grand treasure, the Imperial Seal of the Realm, in a well. This treasure allowed him to become the emperor at any time. Sun Jian decided to keep it and wait for an opportunity to use it.

Meanwhile, Cao Cao tried to kill Lü Bu who was on the run, but Lü Bu caught him in an ambush and his loyal general Xiahou Dun saved him from Lü Bu. The two duelled and Cao Cao fled, but some hidden archers attacked. This time, Cao Cao was saved by his cousins Cao Ren and Cao Hong.

Yuan Shao heard the news and became envious of Sun Jian. He tricked Liu Biao into thinking Sun Jian wanted to usurp the throne and the two clashed, Sun Jian eventually winning. Enraged, Sun Jian attacked Liu Biao, and the general under Liu Biao Huang Zu was sent to fight. Sun Jian's veteran general Huang Gai defeated him and took him prisoner. Liu Biao was getting desperate. His general Lü Gong came up with a plan. At night, Sun Jian taunted the enemy so Lü Gong came out and dueled Sun Jian. Lü Gong was worsted and ran into a narrow valley with Sun Jian in pursuit. Just then, many boulders and arrows fell from the top of the valley, crushing Sun Jian to death. Veteran general Cheng Pu who was behind Sun Jian was devastated. Enraged, he killed Lü Gong, but could not find Sun Jian's body. Then he found out that Sun Jian's body had been taken by the enemy. He brought the news to Sun Jian's son Sun Ce. Sun Ce wept for a long time as he wanted to give his father a funeral. Eventually, the prisoner Huang Zu was given back to Liu Biao in exchange for the body. Sun Ce took refuge in Yuan Shu's territory to slowly gain power.

At the same time, Yuan Shao wanting to expand his territory, attacked Han Fu and Gongsun Zan. Decisively, he destroyed Han Fu and Han Fu fled to Cao Cao. Gongsun Zan was trapped in a middle of many rocky hills, and Yuan Shao's soldiers were about to kill him, but a brave warrior in white rode up to him, destroyed the army, and saved Gongsun Zan. He told Gongsun Zan that his name was Zhao Yun he wanted to defect to him as Yuan Shao was very cruel. The next battle, Gongsun Zan's army fell into disarray due to archers that stopped their wing-like formation, but Zhao Yun arrived and gave Gongsun Zan a victory. However, the next battle was a failure and Gongsun Zan fled with Zhao Yun and Yuan Shao burnt all the nearby cities.

Gongsun Zan was joined by Liu Bei, who became friends with Zhao Yun. Later, Zhao Yun wanted to defect from Gongsun Zan to Liu Bei as he said Gongsun Zan was just as tyrannical as Yuan Shao. Gongsun Zan was eventually pushed back to the north. Dong Zhuo sent a messenger to stop the fighting between the two.

The coalition eventually broke up due to poor leadership and conflicting interests among its members.

Beauty Trap
Meanwhile, in Changan, the minister Wang Yun had devised a plan to kill Dong Zhuo. His adopted daughter, Diao Chan, was known for her beauty and was among the Four Beauties of China. He knew that both Dong Zhuo and Lü Bu liked pretty women. So, Wang Yun invited Lü Bu to his house and Diao Chan successfully seduced him. Wang Yun then allowed Lü Bu to marry Diao Chan. When Lü Bu was away, Wang Yun invited Dong Zhuo and Diao Chan also seduced him. Dong Zhuo took Diao Chan as his own and Wang Yun did not interfere, so he smiled and rode away.

When Lü Bu came back, he was enraged. Wang Yun told Lü Bu that Dong Zhuo had taken Diao Chan and was going to send her to him, so Lü Bu rushed to Dong Zhuo's palace. He found Diao Chan at a lotus pool, staring at a mirror while sobbing quietly. Lü Bu wrapped his arms around her and comforted her, while she expressed her misery at having to be Dong Zhuo's wife. Just when Lü Bu was going to take her with him out of the palace, Dong Zhuo came back and ordered Lü Bu to get out and not come back ever again. Lü Bu fled with no choice. He was vexed.

Wang Yun pretended to bawl to stir Lü Bu into thinking that he needed to kill Dong Zhuo to retrieve Diao Chan. Wang Yun then made up a story where Dong Zhuo would ride on his carriage to become the Han Emperor. This was merely a ruse, as the soldiers immediately raised their weapons at Dong Zhuo. Dong Zhuo scoffed at them and ordered Lü Bu to kill the soldiers. He promised Lü Bu that he would be rewarded with gold coins. Howbeit, Lü Bu thrust his spear through Dong Zhuo's chest, ending his rule of tyranny. Dong Zhuo's relatives would all be executed.

Dong Zhuo's subordinates, Li Jue and Guo Si surrounded the capital. They made a deal: if Wang Yun surrendered nicely, they would not lose any lives. However, if they refused, the city will be invaded. Wang Yun stood on the watchtower. Unwilling to make a decision, he jumped off and committed suicide. Lü Bu tried to fight back, but fell into an ambush and was chased out of Changan. Li Jue and Guo Si thus had the Emperor at their side.

Warlords scurry to seize land
As soon as Li Jue and Guo Si took the Emperor in their hands, a lot of attackers came. First was Ma Teng from Liang Province. His ferocious son Ma Chao decimated Li Jue in battle so Guo Si came up with a plan. He used attrition to wear out Ma Teng's army, and 4 months later, out of supplies, they retreated.

A Yellow Turban rebellion was then staged, so Guo Si issued an Imperial Order to send Cao Cao to fight. Cao Cao collected 30000 Yellow Turban Rebels and turned them into his soldiers. He then defeated Zhang Miao, Han Fu, Kong Zhou and Liu Dai to gain some territory. He gained many talented advisors like Cheng Yu, Guo Jia and Man Chong, as well as powerful generals like Yu Jin, Xu Chu, and Dian Wei.

In the meantime, a civil war has broken out in the Han Empire as warlords fought for territories and power. Cao Cao and Yuan Shu dominated the Central Plains, Tao Qian went to claim a small piece of land in the east, Zhang Xiu was trapped in a small corner and Han Sui and Ma Teng shared their territories with the Qiang's in northern China. Below the Yangtze River, Zhang Lu and Liu Zhang claimed the southwest, Liu Biao took the south and many mountain tribes took the east, with Wang Lang and a few others. Lü Bu had fled to Yuan Shao for a while but Yuan Shao was so annoyed by him that he kicked Lü Bu out.

Cao Cao moves the capital
During those times of upheaval, Li Jue and Guo Si had always worked together, and the Emperor thought they were an unstoppable pair. However, due to a spy, miscommunication spread between them, and Guo Si's wife was convinced that Guo Si liked Li Jue's wife more, so she poisoned wine that came from Li Jue to make Guo Si attack Li Jue, resulting in a civil war. Eventually, Zhang Zhi was able to make them become allies once again, and they were joined by the traitor Li Yue. Still, from the Emperor's side, there was a powerful general named Xu Huang who could single-handedly stop many armies.

The Imperial Army, with the help of Dong Cheng, the Imperial Uncle, returned to Luoyang and started building a small palace. A huge famine struck, and the possibility of Li Jue and Guo Si coming back remained at large, scaring the common people. Yang Biao enlisted the help of Cao Cao, whose general, Xiahou Dun, was able to defeat Li Jue and Guo Si, and from the rebels' side Jia Xu deserted and went to the local village. Cao Cao sent Man Chong to convince Xu Huang to desert to him, then attacked and defeated Yang Feng, who fled to Yuan Shu.

Cao Cao saved Emperor Xian from the remnants of Dong Zhuo's forces, established the new imperial capital in Xu, and became the new head of the central government. He was distraught when he received news that his father, Cao Song was murdered by the governor of Xu Province, Tao Qian. Immediately, Cao Cao attacked Tao Qian. Tao Qian quickly asked for help, and Liu Bei, Gongsun Zan and Kong Rong all arrived. However, the latter had to deal with an uprising of Yellow Turban Rebels and left with Liu Bei to deal with the issue. The great warrior Taishi Ci arrived for his mother had been treated nicely for Kong Rong and she wanted to show gratitude. Taishi Ci, Guan Yu, and Zhang Fei defeated the Yellow Turban uprising and Liu Bei brought his brothers back to help Tao Qian.

Cao Cao pillaged and burnt down all the cities in his way to show his wrath. He had to stop his invasion of Xu when he was attacked by Lü Bu. Lü Bu had taken the whole of Yan Province from Cao Ren in a surprise attack. Cao Cao then went back and attacked Lü Bu. Chen Gong, Lü Bu's newest advisor, gave Lü Bu a strategy. Cao Cao and his forces rushed onto an empty camp, which was set on fire. Lü Bu then came in and started killing left and right. Cao Cao came across Lü Bu, but the latter did not recognise him and Cao Cao tricked Lü Bu into turning around, and escaped by luck. Later, he caught Lü Bu in his own ambush, and reconsidered Yan Province. Lü Bu fled.

For Guo Si, he was killed by his own subordinate while being constantly checked by Cao Cao. Li Jue died for the same reason a year later.

Sun Ce builds a dynasty in Jiangdong
Meanwhile, the ambush set by Liu Biao on Yuan Shao's orders violently concluded Sun Jian's life. His eldest son, Sun Ce, delivered the Imperial Seal as a tribute to the rising pretender, Yuan Shu, in exchange for troops and horses. Sun Ce enlisted the help of Taishi Ci who defected from his lord, defeated the Southern Tribesmen and secured himself a state in the rich riverlands of Jiangdong (Wu), on which the state of Eastern Wu was founded later. His dream was to conquer Jing Province, which was where his father had died.

Tragically, Sun Ce also died at the pinnacle of his career from illness under stress of his terrifying encounter with the ghost of Yu Ji, a venerable magician whom he had falsely accused of heresy and executed in jealousy. Fortunately, Sun Quan, his younger brother and successor, proved to be a capable and charismatic ruler. With assistance from Zhou Yu, Zhang Zhao and others, Sun Quan found hidden talents such as Lu Su to serve him, built up his military forces and maintained stability in Jiangdong.

Lü Bu's takeover of Xu Province from Liu Bei

Liu Bei and his oath brothers Guan Yu and Zhang Fei swore allegiance to the Han Empire in the Oath of the Peach Garden and pledged to do their best for the people. However, their ambitions were not realized as they did not receive due recognition for helping to suppress the Yellow Turban Rebellion and participating in the campaign against Dong Zhuo. Liu Bei had been serving under Tao Qian, and when Cao Cao was attacking to take revenge over his father's death, Liu Bei sent a letter to ask Cao Cao for peace. Cao Cao was furious but had to abandon the mission when Lü Bu started attacking. Everyone thought that Liu Bei was the one who stopped Cao Cao's attack. Hence, Liu Bei was the one to succeed Tao Qian after he died. He gained Lü Bu after Lü Bu was defeated by Cao Cao.

Cao Cao, however, was a pain in the neck. He forced the Emperor to issue imperial order, forcing Liu Bei to attack Yuan Shu, which he did so reluctantly. The battle was a stalemate for the most part. Cao Cao then sent a letter to Liu Bei, telling him to kill Lü Bu, but the message was intercepted by Chen Gong. When Lü Bu questioned Liu Bei, Zhang Fei immediately burst out and was going to kill Lü Bu right then, but Liu Bei stopped Zhang Fei and denied wanting to kill Lü Bu.

When Liu Bei went to attack Yuan Shu, he left Zhang Fei behind to guard Xu Province. Zhang Fei drank heavily and became intoxicated, and forgot about his duties. Lü Bu took this chance to lure Zhang Fei out of the city and take Xu Province. Liu Bei then surrendered to Lü Bu. Yuan Shu wanted to finish off Lü Bu, so he gave Lü Bu lots of jewelry to tell him to force Liu Bei to go to war, knowing Liu Bei would lose. Lü Bu accepted the treasure and forced Liu Bei to go to war. However, a few days later, Lü Bu wanted to spoil Yuan Shu's mood. He made a deal with Yuan Shu，saying that if he hit his spear with an arrow from a 150 steps away, Yuan Shu would stop the war. Yuan Shu, believing that the feat was unobtainable, agreed. Lü Bu was able to hit his spear, and Yuan Shu was forced to stop.

Cao Cao defeats Zhang Xiu and Yuan Shu
Cao Cao had an affair with Zhang Xiu's wife, prompting Zhang Xiu to attack Cao Cao. Zhang Xiu's advisor, Jia Xu, planned an ambush. Cao Cao and his men, still sleeping, were caught in a fire trap and Cao Cao only escaped when Dian Wei, having had his battle axe stolen, used his bare hands to guard Cao Cao while he escaped. Even with several arrows pierced theough his skin, Dian Wei proved to be a resilient fighter and added to Zhang Xiu and Jia Xu's frustration and their capture of Cao Cao had to be stalled. Zhang Xiu cut down the weakened Dian Wei and chased Cao Cao down. An archer shot Cao Cao's horse down, so his son, Cao Ang, lent Cao Cao his horse to escape. Cao Ang was killed while Zhang Xiu pursued. Eventually, the reinforcements arrived and Zhang Xiu fled. Cao Cao deeply mourned Dian Wei's death.

Zhang Fei did not like Lü Bu. Hence, when Liu Bei sent Zhang Fei to buy more horses, he was astounded when Zhang Fei came back in no time. Suddenly, Lü Bu was chasing them from behind! Zhang Fei had stolen his horses and he had flown into a rage no one could stop. Trapped between two sides, Liu Bei defected to Cao Cao.

On the road, Liu Bei met a famous hunter who served him. He wanted to catch Liu Bei a wolf for dinner, but could not find anything till dusk. The hunter then killed his wife and disguised her arm in soup and gave it to Liu Bei who knew nothing about the wife's death to eat. When Liu Bei woke up the next morning to see the wife dead on the kitchen table, he realised what happened, thanked the hunter, and left as fast as he could. When he arrived at Cao Cao's palace, he recounted the scary incident. Cao Cao was greatly pleased and rewarded the hunter handsomely.

Suddenly, Yuan Shu, with the Imperial Seal, declared himself Emperor of the Zhong Dynasty. Instantly, Cao Cao, Lü Bu and even Sun Ce attacked him, leaving him with almost no territory afterwards.

Xiahou Dun loses an eye but does not fret
Cao Cao planned an ambush and moved his army in suspicious directions. Eventually, Chen Gong and Lü Bu's armies came across each other and attacked, only after a while did they realise that they were attacking each other. By the time it was too late, for Cao Cao's army swept upon them and they were utterly crushed.

Cao Cao then diverted the rivers near Lü Bu's territory, flooding it. Cao Cao then started attacking and Lü Bu put up a strong defence.

Cao Cao sent Xiahou Dun to lead reinforcements to help Liu Bei, who was under attack by Lü Bu at Xiaopei. When Xiahou Dun arrived, he encountered Lü Bu's army led by Gao Shun, and he engaged Gao in a one-on-one fight. Both of them duelled for about 40 rounds. Gao Shun could not hold on any longer so he retreated, with Xiahou Dun in pursuit. Lü Bu's subordinate Cao Xing spotted Xiahou Dun on the battlefield, and he fired an arrow which hit Xiahou in his left eye. Xiahou Dun cried out and pulled out the arrow together with his eyeball. He exclaimed, "This is the essence of my father and the blood of my mother, I cannot waste it!" He then swallowed his eyeball and charged towards Cao Xing. Cao Xing was caught off guard and was killed by Xiahou Dun, who speared him in the face. The soldiers from both sides were shocked by the scene before them.

Because of the flooding, people had miserable lives. Lü Bu gave in to wine at his wife's advice, greatly upsetting Chen Gong, who urged him to do something. After a few days, Lü Bu realised the wine had gotten the better of his health, and he banned wine from the whole Province. Anyone caught would be flogged.

The lives of the people in Lü Bu's territory were extremely miserable, and Lü Bu did not treat his subordinates well, often flogging them. Hence, they tied Lü Bu up in his sleep and his own men surrendered him, Chen Gong, and Zhang Liao to Cao Cao. Chen Gong, wrapped in bounds, scolded Cao Cao for being a traitor, even worse tha. LÜ Bu, who he commented was a fool. Chen Gong accepted his execution with dignity, forcing a reluctant executor to chop his head off as Cao Cao wept bitterly. Chen Gong even stretched his neck for the blow.

Lü Bu groveled and pleaded with Cao Cao to let him live. Cao Cao was keen not to execute him. However, Liu Bei, sick and tired of Lü Bu, reminded Cao Cao of how Dong Zhuo had been betrayed by Lü Bu. Lü Bu was then executed.

Cao Cao and Liu Bei discuss about heroes
Liu Bei then followed Cao Cao back to the imperial capital, Xu, where Emperor Xian honored him as his "Imperial Uncle". During a hunting round, the Emperor struggled tl shoot down a deer. Cao Cao took the Emperor's golden bow and arrows and shot the deer down. The spectators, thinking the Emperor had shot the deer down, shouted, "Long live the Emperor!" Emperor Xian was disgusted when Cao Cao laughed. Guan Yu was so offended that he wanted to kill Cao Cao but Liu Bei stopped him, saying the three would be executed for killing him.

Emperor Xian wrote a secret decree in blood to his father-in-law, Dong Cheng, and ordered him to get rid of Cao. Dong Cheng secretly contacted Liu Bei and others and they planned to assassinate Cao Cao.

Liu Bei was afraid that Cao Cao would find out about his plot. Hence, he spent his time learning how to plant seeds. Cao Cao grew suspicious and his officials told him that Liu Bei's kindness would end up allowing him to get very popular and dangerous. Cao Cao invited Liu Bei to a banquet and told him a very famous story where his soldiers were thirsty in a desert. He found some trees and told his soldiers to run to the forest to get the sweet berries to eat. His soldiers raced to the forest and Cao Cao's troops moved significantly faster.

Cao Cao then changed the topic and asked Liu Bei who he thought were the heroes of China. Liu Bei thought that Yuan Shu, Yuan Shao, and Sun Ce were heroes. Cao Cao disagreed, claiming that Yuan Shu was a weak pretender, Yuan Shao was indecisive and a coward and Sun Ce was just following his father's legacy. Liu Bei guessed Liu Biao, Liu Zhang, Ma Teng, Han Sui, Zhang Lu and Zhang Xiu, but Cao Cao deemed them worthless. He said that heroes had great ambitions.

Cao Cao then announced that he and Liu Bei were the only heroes of China. Liu Bei was alarmed and his chopsticks dropped to the floor. Just then, lightning struck and Liu Bei took his own time to recover. Cao Cao asked Liu Bei how a hero can be scared of lightning, and Liu Bei said that if sages could consider lightning powerful, there is no wrong to be scared. Cao Cao's suspicions of Liu Bei vanished. Liu Bei then took the opportunity to get out of Cao Cao's territory by pretending to go to war with Yuan Shu, who had been totally crushed after starting his own dynasty.

Liu Bei seizes and loses Xu Province again
Yuan Shu perished, unable to swallow the coarse food his soldiers ate. His last request was for honey water, but his soldiers only had blood. He was received by Che Zhou, the newly appointed officer. Che Zhou tried to assassinate Liu Bei so Guan Yu slew him. This enraged Cao Cao, who sent Wang Zhong and Liu Dai to attack. Wang Zhong sent up the banners of Cao Cao to trick Liu Bei into thinking Cao Cao had come. Liu Bei avoided the ruse and Zhang Fei caught the hapless warrior. But in prison, he was treated nicely, and when Guan Yu captured Liu Dai sooner, they were released and told to inform Cao Cao that Liu Bei only killed Che Zhou because he was nearly killed first.

Meanwhile, the advisor Kong Rong suggested Mi Heng to Cao Cao, who wanted to settle peace with Liu Biao and Zhang Xiu. Unexpectedly, Mi Heng acted arrogantly and rebuked Cao Cao and all his advisors, giving insults like saying advisor Xun Yu would make a good tomb guardian, Zhang Liao was the best drum enthusiast, Xu Huang should be sent to kill cattle and pigs, and so on, insulting Cao Cao, who banished him. Cao Cao sent him to Liu Biao, who was also treated poorly. Liu Biao, displeased with Cao Cao because of Mi Heng, made peace with Yuan Shao instead, and planned a joint attack with Ma Teng to attack the capital.

Meanwhile, the plans to kill Cao Cao were underway as Dong Cheng worked hard day and night. One day, his physician came and saw that Dong Cheng was stressed. Dong Cheng explained, and the physician, Ji Ping, bit his finger and pledged to kill Cao Cao. One of Dong Cheng's officers flirted with his handmaid, annoying Dong Cheng, who flogged him multiple times. This made the officer furious and reported Dong Cheng and Ji Ping. Cao Cao then feigned a headache, and Ji Ping fell for it. He came to Cao Cao's room, where Cao Cao refused the poisoned medication, until Ji Ping realised the plot had been discovered and he forcefully tried to pour the poison into Cao Cao's eye. Cao Cao's loud screams alerted Xu Chu, who barged in and slew the doctor. Cao Cao had Dong Cheng and the others arrested and executed along with their families. Only Ma Teng and Liu Bei escaped, the former fleeing back to his own province.

Cao Cao was still unhappy, so he executed the two and sent an army to attack. Liu Bei called for Yuan Shao's help, but the latter was tending to his sick son. Yuan Shao spread rumours to the capital that Cao Cao was a bad and tyrannical person. Back at the capital, the two advisors Xun Yu and Guo Jia were able to clear the rumors. Cao Cao defeated Liu Bei at Xu, and Liu Bei and Zhang Fei disappeared in the chaos. Guan Yu was reminded that Liu Bei's two wives were still in the capital, so he remained at the top of a hill, surrounded by an army led by Zhang Liao.

Guan Yu slays two generals
When Liu Bei fled to Yuan Shao, he had abandoned his wives. Guan Yu stayed back to take care of them and he was surrounded on a hill. Zhang Liao approached him and asked him to surrender. Guan Yu refused and asked death. At this, Zhang Liao sniggered and accused Guan Yu of breaking the oath of the peach garden, the trust between brothers by leaving Liu Bei's wives alone, and his own reputation if he died. Guan Yu then proposed 3 conditions.

Guan Yu had 3 conditions for surrendering. Firstly, he would only submit to the emperor and not Cao Cao. Secondly, he would get to decide the safety arrangements of Liu Bei's wives. Lastly, if he heard news of Liu Bei, he would be allowed to leave.

Zhang Liao hastened to report to Cao Cao. Cao Cao eventually agreed, thinking that he could win Guan Yu over with immense kindness. He gave Guan Yu a nice home, pretty girls to look after him and lavish banquets, but Guan Yu refused to surrender to Cao Cao. Cao Cao gave up persuading Guan Yu after realising that Guan Yu was a true man who never betrays his principles. Once, Cao Cao noticed Guan Yu's cloak was old, so he bade his servants make a new one. When Cao Cao presented the cloak to Guan Yu, Guan Yu thanked him profusely, but wore the new cloak under the old and worn-out cloak. Cao Cao asked why, and Guan Yu replied that the old cloak was a gift from Liu Bei, and he would put nobody above his brother. Cao Cao was amazed by this, but grew disappointed.

Yuan Shao sent his 2 generals to attack Cao Cao. They were the famed Yan Liang and Wen Chou. Cao Cao deployed Guan Yu to attack Yan Liang while Zhang Liao and Xu Huang attack Wen Chou. Guan Yu was given the Red Hare by Cao Cao. Guan Yu was happy about it as he could ride to his brother quicker. Using the speed if the Red Hare and his skill at fighting, Guan Yu killed Yan Liang in no time. When Zhang Liao and Xu Huang both struggled against Wen Chou, Guan Yu rode on his Red Hare to them and cut down Wen Chou in a flash. Yuan Shao wanted to execute Liu Bei but due to Yuan Shao's indecisiveness, he spared Liu Bei. His incessant indecisiveness would cost him in his next battle.

Guan Yu crosses five gates and slays six generals
Guan Yu received news of Liu Bei's whereabouts and rushed to Yuan Shao's territory. Cao Cao gave him a warm towel to express his gratitude. Cao Cao's own generals looked down on him for letting Guan Yu go so easily. Thus, Guan Yu faced resistance while going to meet Liu Bei. When Guan Yu had left, he realised the carriage with the two wives were missing. He searched and found a general named Liao Hua with the two wives. Guan Yu was going to kill Liao Hua when the two wives stopped him. Then, Liao Hua explained that he had saved the wives from some bandits and the wives nodded their heads. Guan Yu felt grateful and recruited Liao Hua.

On the first gate, he met Kong Xiu. Kong Xiu was rude and told him to get off or else just leave the wives here and get consent from Cao Cao. This enraged Guan Yu, so he cut Kong Xiu down in a flash. On the second gate, he met Meng Tan and Han Fu. Meng Tan was sliced in two while Han Fu circled behind and prepared to shoot an arrow. The arrow hits, but Guan Yu does not care and kills Han Fu by slicing him in half.

Guan Yu was about to reach the third gate. News spread to the guard Bian Xi. Bian Xi was a warrior who used nunchucks. Knowing that three major generals had already fallen to Guan Yu, he knew that he needed to use trickery if he wanted revenge. Hence, he welcomed Guan Yu and gave him some food to eat, while he ordered some troops to kill Guan Yu when he get out of the building. While Guan Yu was alone, a monk came to him and explained Bian Xi's trick. Guan Yu was furious and dueled Bian Xi, killing him.

At the fourth gate, he met Wang Zhi. Wang Zhi treated him nicely, and knowing Guan Yu was tired, let him and the wives rest in the city. However, Wang Zhi had planned to burn the city down during the night. His subordinate Hu Ban knew that. Hu Ban was curious to see how the respected Guan Yu looked like, so he crept around, and Guan Yu saw him. Hu Ban then revealed Wang Zhi's ambush, and Guan Yu came with his wives and escaped, while a fire blazed in the city they had escaped. Wang Zhi came riding after them to kill Guan Yu, but was killed by Guan Yu. At the fifth gate, he killed Qin Qi, and then Xiahou Dun came and challenged him to a fight. They were equally matched, and suddenly Zhang Liao came giving Guan Yu consent to cross over. When Guan Yu reached the border of Yuan Shao's territory, Sun Qian, Liu Bei's follower and court member, informed Guan Yu that Liu Bei had gone to Runan. Guan Yu then went to Runan and found an eager follower in Zhou Cang. Then, he received news that Liu Bei was back in Yuan Shao's territory.

He found a farmer's son and took a liking for him. The farmer let him take the son. Guan Yu named the son Guan Ping. He found Zhang Fei, but Zhang Fei thought that Guan Yu had betrayed him as Cao Cao's general Cai Yang was following him. Guan Yu cut the general down and forgave his brother for the misunderstanding. The two brothers met up with Liu Bei at Runan and made it their temporary base. Finally, the three brothers met and had a happy reunion. Just then, Zhou Cang and Liao Hua came back very injured, having arrived from an invading army camp. When Liu Bei checked it out, he was surprised to see Zhao Yun there. Zhao Yun immediately stopped attacking and revealed that after Gongsun Zan's death, he had been searching for Liu Bei.

This famous Chinese story shows the bravery and resilience of Guan Yu and has been adapted into many films and shows.

Battle of Guandu
Now that Yan Liang and Wen Chou had died, a war between Cao Cao and Yuan Shao seemed inevitable. Yuan Shao's force was predictably larger than Cao Cao's force, and Cao Cao was anxious. Seeing this, Guo Jia advised Cao Cao not to be anxious. Then, using evidence, proved that Cao Cao beat Yuan Shao in many important values such as principle, righteousness,  management, tolerance, strategy, virtue, benevolence, military skill, culture and wisdom. Cao Cao felt relieved at once and started mobilising his troops.

Yuan Shao asked for help from Liu Biao and Sun Ce in the battle. Liu Biao rejected, but Sun Ce agreed, unhappy that Cao Cao bad denied his request to be promoted. However, he was harassed by a Taoist magician and died of stress. His younger brother Sun Quan replaced him and did not send support to Yuan Shao.

After settling the nearby provinces, including a rebellion led by former Yellow Turbans, and internal affairs with the court, Cao Cao turned his attention north to Yuan Shao, who himself had eliminated his northern rival Gongsun Zan that same year. Yuan Shao, himself of higher nobility than Cao Cao, amassed a large army of 700,000 and camped along the northern bank of the Yellow River.

In the summer of 200, after months of preparations, the armies of Cao Cao and Yuan Shao clashed at the Battle of Guandu (near present-day Kaifeng). Cao Cao's army was outnumbered 10 to 1 by Yuan Shao. Cao Cao also was running out of supplies. The battle began with Cao Cao charging head-on. His army was annihilated by hidden archers. For a few weeks, both sides engaged in trench warfare, with Yuan Shao gaining the upper hand slowly. In desperation, the scholar Liu Hua proposed to Cao Cao his strategy-an improvised trebuchet. The plan worked, and Yuan Shao was driven back. Cao Cao then camped at Guandu. However, Cao Cao's food was running extremely low, and he barely had enough to supply for 3 months.

Yuan Shao's messenger told him about Cao Cao's situation. Surprisingly, Yuan Shao thought that it was a trick and refused to do anything. Had he sent his army to Cao Cao's base, he would have won the battle. Angered by this, many of Yuan Shao's generals such as Zhang He left for Cao Cao. Cao Cao's old friend, Xu You, also left for Cao Cao. When Cao Cao heard about this, he was so excited he forgot to put on his shoes. Cao Cao's old friend advised Cao Cao to burn Yuan Shao's supply depot and take as much as he could. With no food, Yuan Shao's army could not advance. The panicking Yuan Shao then sent 2 forces to Cao Cao's base and his burnt supply depot. Cao Cao ambushed the group heading to his supply depot and sent a false letter to Yuan Shao, making the latter think that Cao Cao had been defeated at the supply depot. Then, while his army clashed with Yuan Shao-s army, Cao Cao led a pincer attack to defeat Yuan Shao's army. Cao Cao then spread false rumours that he had surrounded Yuan Shao's base, so Yuan Shao panicked and defended his camp evenly. Cao Cao then broke through the thin line of defence and sent Yuan Shao running.

Cao Cao controls Northern China
After being defeated, Yuan Shao eventually fell ill and died in 202. Cao Cao took advantage of Yuan Shao's death, which resulted in division among his sons, and advanced to the north. In 204, after the Battle of Ye, Cao Cao captured the city of Ye. Xu You was killed by Cao Cao's bodyguard Xu Chu for behaving arrogantly. Xu Chu was scolded and Xu You was given a lavish burial.

By the end of 207, after a victorious campaign beyond the frontier against the Wuhuan culminating in the Battle of White Wolf Mountain, Cao Cao achieved complete dominance of the North China Plain. He now controlled China's heartland, including Yuan Shao's former territory, and half of the Chinese population.

Cao Cao defeated Yuan Tan and Yuan Shang, who both fled to Gongsun Du. Cao Cao wanted to send troops to attack Gongsun Du, but the great strategist Guo Jia, rejected, thinking Gongsun Du did not want to be enemies with Cao Cao. True enough, Cao Cao received a letter from Gongsun Du containing the heads of the two Yuan's. Cao Cao then conquered the territories of the two Yuan's. Sadly, Guo Jia fell ill and died. Cao Cao was extremely sad that such a talent like Guo Jia would die so early in his career.

Finding Xu Shu
Since 200, Liu Biao put Liu Bei in charge of Xinye, where he was treated very well. Liu Bei had encouraged Liu Biao to attack Cao Cao while he was on the Northern campaign, but Liu Biao refused. Now, Liu Biao could only regret as Cao Cao got even stronger. Liu Bei lamented that he was old and fat after not being in war for so long and not fulfilling his duty.

Liu Biao favoured his younger son Liu Qi, but the rightful heir to the throne was his other son Liu Cong. Liu Biao intended to announce that Liu Qi be the heir, but Liu Bei advised him not to as it would cause chaos, and rather gradually lower Liu Cong's power until they were weak enough for Liu Qi to be the new ruler.

However, a woman had heard all of that from behind a wall. It was Liu Biao's first wife, the mother of Liu Cong, and she was furious. Hence, she sent her brother Cai Mao to make an ambush. Zhao Yun was lured away from Liu Bei, but the ambush was leaked and Liu Bei was sent packing. His horse, Dilu, was able to jump over the Tan Stream and save his master. Zhao Yun came back and slew Cai Mao's subordinates and Cai Mao ran for his life. But by then, Liu Bei had wandered off. He came across a wise man named Water Mirror who told him that he would need to fulfill a prophecy and to do it, he would need better men. Liu Bei, offended, replied that he already had Guan Yu, Zhang Fei, Zhao Yun, Guan Ping, Liu Feng, Zhou Cang, Liao Hua as generals and Mi Zhu and Sun Qian as court members. Water Mirror suggested him to find the "Sleeping Dragon" or the "Fledging Phoenix" as Liu Bei lacked a good advisor.

Liu Bei, returning from the Water Mirror's house, found an intelligent strategist Xu Shu who was singing in the market, who preferred to be called Tan Fu as Xu Shu was his secret identity. He helped defeat Cao Cao numerous times and defeated general Cao Ren by letting Zhao Yun break throufh his 8 Gate Formation. Guan Yu then chased Cao Ren back to his base.

Cao Cao was able to find out Xu Shu's personal information and tricked him into thinking that he held his mother hostage. Before Xu Shu left Liu Bei, he advised Liu to visit the tactician Zhuge Liang at his residence at Longzhong. Sadly, for Xu Shu, his mother committed suicide learning that he would willingly betray the benevolent Liu Bei for the tyrannical Cao Cao. As for the gifts that Cao Cao gave, Xu Shu accepted none.

Three visits to the thatched cottage
On the first time, Zhuge Liang was not at home. On the second time, Zhuge Liang's younger brother was at home, as well as his younger sister. Zhang Fei quarelled with the young girl about why Zhuge Liang, knowing that Liu Bei wanted to visit, still went out. The brother informed Liu Bei that they had narrowly missed Zhuge Liang.

On the third time, it was Liu Bei, Guan Yu and Zhang Fei's brotherhood anniversary, and Guan Yu and Zhang Fei did not want to visit but to celebrate. Liu Bei decided to go on his own. Learning that, Guan Yu and Zhang Fei immediately chased him, not wanting him to be in danger. When they arrived at Zhuge Liang's residence, the brother informed them that Zhuge Liang was asleep. Thus, the three men stood outside for hours before Zhuge Liang awoke.

Zhuge Liang was impressed by Liu Bei's kindness as he was treated well by Liu Bei so he decided to work for him. Zhuge Liang came up with the strategy to conquer China.

Firstly, Liu Bei had to conquer Jing Province, Liu Biao's territory. This was because two rivers passed through there and supplies could easily be passed throughout the Province. Next, he had to conquer Liu Zhang and Zhang Lu to the west. Those areas had fertile soil and a mountainous terrain for defence. Finally, they had to ally with Sun Quan in Jiang Dong and crush Cao Cao. Then, he would be able to take over most of China and then finish off Cao Cao and Sun Quan.

Battle of Bowang
Following his unification of central and northern China under his control, Cao Cao, having been appointed Imperial Chancellor by Emperor Xian, led his forces on a southern campaign to eliminate Liu Bei and Sun Quan. Guan Yu and Zhang Fei did not trust Zhuge Liang as a strategist. However, Zhuge Liang's time to shine came quickly when Xiahou Dun led a colossal army at Boma to attack with the intention of killing Liu Bei.

Zhuge Liang assigned Zhao Yun to attack Xiahou Dun and lure Xiahou Dun into the forest. In the forest, Guan Yu and Zhang Fei would sit on threat and right sides to attack when Xiahou Dun enters the forest. Guan Ping and Liu Bei's adopted son Liu Feng would set fire to the forest while Liu Bei himself would lead the backup army to prevent Xiahou Dun from escaping.

When Zhao Yun retreated from a rather passive duel with Xiahou Dun, his subordinates Yu Jin and Li Dian suggested not to pursue as they suspected an ambush. Xiahou Dun pursued on into the forest where he fought Liu Bei and easily drove him back. He remarked to Li Dian, "Is this the ambush you were talking about?" Suddenly, the forest became set on fire and Zhang Fei charged from the side. Zhang Fei slaughtered many of Xiahou Dun's men as Xiahou Dun barely escaped alive with Guan Yu chasing him out of the forest. Xiahou Dun was saved by a small backup force that stalled enough time for him, Yu Jin and Li Dian to retreat. After the battle, Yu Jin and Li Dian were promoted for being able to recognise the ambush.

Later, Cao Cao sent two armies led by Cao Ren and Xu Chu to attack Xinye. Zhuge Liang gave Guan Yu a cloth bag and told him to go to the river. Then, he told Guan Yu to open the bag when the enemy arrived and read the message. Then, Liu Bei and Zhuge Liang kept on the lookout and saw the enemy coming, racing towards Xinye, swinging their swords ready to kill. They saw Liu Bei and Zhuge Liang drinking wine on a hill, and immediately raced up. However, they were blocked by rolling logs that fell. Cao Ren and Xu Chu resorted to camping for the night. When the Cao army was sleeping soundly, Zhao Yun and a few archers shot flaming arrows at the camps, burning them and Zhao Yun rushed into the chaos, killing left and right. At the same time, Liu Bei and Zhuge Liang were assisting in evacuating the city. When Liu Bei had ensured all the citizens had evacuated, Zhao Yun and those archers burned Xinye down. When the Cao backup army arrived, they were shocked to see what had happened.

Liu Bei retreats to Fancheng
Cao Cao then sent an even bigger army to reinforce the first army. Liu Cong, the son of the recently passed Liu Biao, had surrendered to Cao Cao, making Liu Bei furious. Zhuge Liang sent Liu Feng and Mi Fang to confuse the enemy at Bowang and catch up. Liu Bei, along with Zhuge Liang, Mi Zhu, Zhang Fei and Zhao Yun and the whole population of Xinye marched away to Fancheng with Sun Qian. Zhang Fei met with Xu Chu and defeated him in a duel. Guan Yu was made to prepare boats.

When Liu Bei was on the river, Cai Mao and his soldiers started shooting. They were stopped by Wei Yan, who frightened the people and made the whole situation worse as a conflict seemed to brew. Wei Yan got lost and had no choice but to go to Han Xuan, a minor warlord. Cai Mao met up with Cao Cao and surrendered. Liu Cong was executed by Cao Cao later. Cao Cao attempted to kill Zhuge Liang's family, but they too had left.

Zhuge Liang left to support Liu Feng, who with Mi Fang had successfully halted the enemy.

Just then, Mi Fang rushed over to Liu Bei, shouting "Zhao Yun went to Cao Cao!" Liu Bei refused to believe it. Zhang Fei rushed off to Changban bridge to defend it, thinking Zhao Yun was a traitor. Zhang Fei had only 50 soldiers with him guarding the bridge, but he ordered them to use wooden logs to create stomping noises to try and scare Cao Cao's army into thinking there was an ambush.

Zhao Yun rides through Cao Cao's army to save A Dou
Zhao Yun had been fighting with Cao soldiers. First, he saved a carriage guard, who told him that the two wives had been stolen along with the carriage, the horses and the infant A Dou. Zhao Yun was rushing around when he saw Lady Gan. He asked Lady Gan if she had seen Lady Mi and Liu Bei's infant son Liu Shan, and she shrugged. Zhao Yun then saw some soldiers holding Mi Zhu hostage, and Zhao Yun saved him, killing Cao Cao's general. Zhao Yun, with Lady Gan and Mi Zhu, went to Changban Bridge and saw Zhang Fei. He talked with Zhang Fei and convinced him he had not betrayed. Then, he rushed back into the chaos.

Zhao Yun killed the captain Xiahou En, the swordbearer of Cao Cao. Zhao Yun picked up the sword. He eventually found Lady Mi next to a well, clutching her son. Zhao Yun wanted to pick both of them up, but Lady Mi said that she was heavily injured and would only slow the group down, so she jumped into the well. Zhao Yun felt regretful, and with the infant in one arm, dashed back to Changban bridge. The veteran general Zhang He caught Zhao Yun in an ambush, causing him to fall in a hole. Zhang He laughed at Zhao Yun. Suddenly, Zhao Yun jumped out of the hole and swiped at Zhang He, who dodged in the nick of time. Zhang He then fled. Zhao Yun continued this onslaught. He met with Cao Hong, who fled without trying. He then met up with Zhong Jin and Zhong Shen, who were sliced in half. Zhao Yun was chased, and was too exhausted to fight. Fortunately, he reached Changban bridge, and Zhang Fei rescued him.

Wen Ping who was chasing Zhao Yun, saw Zhang Fei, so he stopped on the other end of the bridge. The messengers arrived and Cao Cao came to see the scene for himself. Zhang Fei held off Cao Cao,  Xiahou Dun, Zhang Liao, Cao Ren, Zhang He, and Cao Cao's army at the same time with a deafening roar. Nobody was willing to fight Zhang Fei in a one-on-one battle and Cao Cao suspected trickery. One of Cao Cao's staff was so frightened he dropped of his horse. Many soldiers dropped their weapons too. Cao Cao was so scared that he ran away, but was rescued by Zhang Liao. While the army was disorganised, Zhang Fei broke the bridge and fled.

When Zhao Yun came back, Liu Bei tossed Liu Shan onto the floor and scolded him for nearly costing Zhao Yun's life. Zhao Yun was appalled.

Liu Bei allies with Sun Quan
In 208, After the Battle of Changban, Cao Cao sent a letter to Sun Quan, asking him to surrender.
All of Sun Quan's officials want Sun Quan to surrender to Cao Cao except for Lu Su. Lu Su was not sure if he could convince Sun Quan not to surrender. Thus, he brought with him the mastermind Zhuge Liang.

Zhuge Liang first discussed with Zhang Zhao who really wanted to surrender. He scoffed at Zhuge Liang, saying that he was so weak he could not even maintain Liu Bei's territory. Zhuge Liang said, "If you send a sick man to fight, he would surely lose. Liu Bei does not even have military supplies and you expect him to defeat Cao Cao's grand army twice. How ridiculous!" Zhang Zhao, humiliated, kept quiet.

Lu Su then brought Zhuge Liang to Sun Quan. Sun Quan did want to surrender, but at the same time didn't. To persuade him, Zhuge Liang exaggerated the size of Cao Cao's army to twice its size, causing both Sun Quan and Lu Su to turn pale in fear. Then, he added that Liu Bei knew so yet he never gave up and surrendered. Sun Quan, with access to the sea and fertile soil, should not surrender.

In the end, Sun Quan smashed his table hard, causing a piece of the corner to fly off. He said that whoever disagreed would end up like the table. He placed Zhou Yu in command of his army in preparation for war with Cao Cao. Zhuge Liang remained temporarily in Wu territory to assist Zhou Yu. Zhou Yu felt that Zhuge Liang would become a threat to Sun Quan in the future and attempted to kill him on a few occasions but ultimately failed due to Zhuge Liang's superior intuition, and ended up having no choice but to cooperate with Zhuge Liang.

Thus, the plan to win the Battle of Red Cliffs was made by Zhou Yu. Zhou Yu had tricked Cao Cao's messenger, Jiang Gan, into thinking that Cao Cao's naval trainer Cai Mao was planning a rebellion. Cao Cao executed him before he realized the trap.

Borrowing arrows from straw boats
Zhuge Liang showed his intelligence when he was able to collect 100 000 arrows in 3 days using straw people. For the first three days, Lu Su noticed Zhuge Liang had not even started manufacturing arrows. When he questioned Zhuge Liang, Zhuge Liang ignored the question and asked him for 20 boats filled with straw people. Lu Su was confused but did so anyway.

With Lu Su's help, Zhuge Liang was able to fill boats with straw people. On a foggy morning, Zhuge Liang and Lu Su went onto the boats and chatted while drinking wine. They approached Cao Cao's camp and Cao Cao could not identify whether it was a trap, so he ordered his somdiers to shoot arrows at their boats. The arrows got stuck onto the straw people. Cao Cao could not see them due to the fog.

When the fog was over, soldiers rushed from behind the straw people and shouted, "多謝丞相！” which meant thank you to Cao Cao. Eventually, more than 100000 arrows were stuck onto the boats, and Zhou Yu was furious that Zhuge Liang had defied the odds.

Zhuge Liang dances for the eastern wind
Zhou Yu and the aging general Huang Gai did a public act. Huang Gai pretended to support Cao Cao and was thus hit with a birch cane fifty times until blood leaked out. Huang Gai then sent his trusted friend Kan Ze to convince Cao Cao. When Kan Ze met Cao Cao, Cao Cao originally saw through the trick and put Kan Ze to death. Kan Ze then laughed and mocked Cao Cao, and Cao Cao questioned Kan Ze why the date was not written. Kan Ze then said that Huang Gai was waiting for an opportunity to escape. Cao Cao then trusted Kan Ze and gave him some gifts and some for Huang Gai.

Zhou Yu sent the fledgling phoenix, Pang Tong, to trick Cao Cao that since his fleet was mainly composed of northern soldiers, he should chain his ships from stem to stem. Cao Cao fell for the trick. Originally, Cheng Yu and Xun Yu suspected fire could be used to burn the ships connected by chains, but Cao Cao said that the winter winds are always northern and there should be no fear.

Cao Cao and his massive fleet had a feast and Cao Cao composed a beautiful song. The northern winds blew strongly, and one of the flags of Zhou Yu fell down and slapped him in the cheek, causing Zhou Yu to fall into a swoon. Zhou Yu fell ill and Zhuge Liang surmised it was due to stress. The one element that they could not control was missing- a south-eastern wind. Zhuge Liang assured Zhou Yu that he could summon the south-eastern wind. Zhou Yu chuckled, thinking that Zhuge Liang had humiliated himself.

Zhou Yu beautified a temple and fortified it. Then, he removed the ceiling and invited the public to surround the temple. Zhuge Liang brandished two swords and danced in the center of the temple where Zhou Yu had invited him to summon the south-eastern wind. To Zhou Yu's surprise, the south-eastern wind did come at night, enraging Zhou Yu. Zhuge Liang escaped Zhou Yu's ambush and retreated safely to Zhao Yun's ship. He then sent Zhao Yun and Zhang Fei to guard the forest which Cao Cao would likely retreat to. Originally, he did not want to send Guan Yu as Guan Yu owed Cao Cao a favor when Guan Yu was allowed to have lavish banquets every day while Liu Bei was at Yuan Shao's base. Guan Yu insisted, so Zhuge Liang let him go.

Battle of Red Cliffs
In the morning, Huang Gai sent a letter to Cao Cao that Zhou Yu fell ill and was not on the lookout, so he could defect. Huang Gai sent his ships to Cao Cao's base, feigning surrender. When Huang Gai's ships were surprisingly fast, Cao Cao became suspicious. Cheng Yu pointed out that the boats were floating, which means they were carrying fuel, and suddenly he felt the strong eastern breeze and warned Cao Cao, who sent Wen Ping to halt them. Huang Gai did not listen and crashed into Wen Ping's boat. Then, the boats, filled with reed and dry wood, were lit on fire and rammed straight into Cao Cao's fleet. Chained from stem to stem and backed by the South-easterly wind, the fire spread fast. The ships and the main camp burned, and the Cliffs were painted red by the blood of Cao Cao's army. Cao Cao, in his neatly dressed outfit, was easily recognizable, and Huang Gai shouted for him to stop and leapt onto his boat.

Huang Gai dueled with Cao Cao on a boat, but was shot by Zhang Liao and dropped into the water. Zhang Liao rescued Cao Cao and the two sailed to the forest to meet Xu Huang, Xu Chu, and the reinforcements. Huang Gai was saved by his soldiers.

Zhuge Liang knew that Cao Cao would escape into the forest, so he made Zhao Yun and Zhang Fei at different parts of the forest to ambush Cao Cao. Guan Yu also wanted to join, but Zhuge Liang disagreed saying that Guan Yu would spare Cao Cao because of the kindness he was treated. Guan Yu eventually had to sign it, and failure to meant death.

Cao Cao and the loyal Zhang Liao came into the forest. Instantly, Lü Meng, Sun Quan's general, who was there by sheer luck, attacked Cao Cao, but Cao Cao was joined by Zhang He who attacked. LÜ Meng was unable to pursue Cao Cao, so he sent the signal to Gan Ning who was nearby. Gan Ning attacked, but this time Wen Ping and Xu Huang joined Cao Cao and the latter fought Gan Ning and bought enough time for Cao Cao to retreat. Lu Xun, another general, also saw Lü Meng's signal and rushed to attack. However, Cao Cao got a lucky escape.

Cao Cao was able to escape into the forest, where he took a rest. Suddenly, he burst out laughing, saying that Zhuge Liang and Zhou Yu were too overconfident and that if he were them, he would place an ambush there.

Suddenly, Zhao Yun jumped out of hiding and dueled with Xu Huang. Cao Cao was alarmed and fled with Zhang Liao. The laughter happened again in an empty village, and this time Zhang Fei came out. Zhang Fei dueled with Zhang Liao and Cao Cao fled on his own.

Guan Yu spares Cao Cao
Cao Cao was left with two paths, a narrow path that was a shortcut to his territory or a longer path that was wider. When Cao Cao saw that the shorter path was smoking, he thought that Zhuge Liang had placed an ambush on the wider path, saying that Zhuge Liang would try to dissuade him from taking the short path by placing smoke there.

He took the shorter path but was ambushed by Guan Yu. He kneeled down and pleaded with Guan Yu and reminded him of the times he was treated nicely. Guan Yu, seeing the mighty Cao Cao and Zhang Liao was worn out and all the soldiers half dead, felt pity and tears sprung to his eyes. Guan Yu ordered that the formation be broken and Cao Cao passed through.

Later, Cao Cao was met by Cao Ren and they returned to the capital. When Zhao Yun and Zhang Fei returned to camp, they all had soldier items with them. However, Guan Yu did not, making Zhuge Liang suspicious. Guan Yu admitted, and Zhuge Liang was going to execute him, but Liu Bei and Zhang Fei dropped to the floor and pleaded mercy. Zhuge Liang eventually dropped the topic.

Liu Bei claims Jing Province for free
Sun Quan and Liu Bei started vying for control of southern Jing Province after their victory. Zhuge Liang, knowing that Zhou Yu would likely fail, asked him to capture Jing Province first. Cao Ren shot Zhou Yu in the chest with a poison arrow that acts when Zhou Yu is enraged. Sun Quan then sent his general Taishi Ci to attack He Fei, but Taishi Ci's ambush backfired against him and he was killed by Zhang Liao. After failing, Zhou Yu received news that Guan Yu, Zhang Fei, and Zhao Yun had already conquered the rest of Jing Province. He fainted due to the poison arrow.

Zhuge Liang sent Zhao Yun and Zhang Fei to attack the remaining cities in Jing Province and the two did so with merit. Along the way, Zhao Yun met someone similar to him in Zhao Fang and they became brothers, but Zhao Yun was upset by Zhao Fang when the latter proposed him a wife as Zhao Yun said that it would be disrupting the family tree. Zhao Fang then tried to murder Zhao Yun but failed.

Guan Yu, wanting a challenge, attacked Han Xuan, who used his aged general and best warrior Huang Zhong to attack Guan Yu. However, when Guan Yu spared Huang Zhong when he fell off his horse, Huang Zhong refused to kill Guan Yu and in the next fight, intentionally missed his shots. Seeing this, Han Xuan wanted to execute Huang Zhong, but was saved by Wei Yan. The two defected to Liu Bei. Liu Bei was delighted to accept Huang Zhong and Wei Yan, but Zhuge Liang did not like Wei Yan who was narrow minded and rebellious.

Zhou Yu's fake marriage scheme backfires
Sun Quan sent Lu Su to talk with Zhuge Liang and Liu Bei about returning Jing Province. Previously, Zhuge Liang said that he would return it after Liu Qi died, but he did not, so Lu Su reminded him. However, Zhuge Liang, a fluent speaker, was able to convince Lu Su that he would give it back after Liu Bei had conquered Liu Zhang's lands. Zhou Yu told Lu Su that he was tricked, but he had a scheme that he had discussed with Sun Quan. Liu Bei's wife Lady Gan had died, and Liu Bei was in distress every day. Thus, Sun Quan offered his sister Lady Sun as a wife. Zhuge Liang knew it was Zhou Yu's scheme, but told Liu Bei to accept, even though the latter was way older than Lady Sun. Then, he gave Zhao Yun three bags and told him to open them in three different situations.

Liu Bei made his way into Wu and Zhao Yun opened the first bag. He ordered all the soldiers to spread the word that Liu Bei was going to marry Lady Sun. Liu Bei met with Lord Qiao and the latter was impressed with Liu Bei's conduct and went to Sun Quan's mother to spread the news. Sun Quan's mother was horrified to learn it and summoned Sun Quan. Sun Quan revealed the plot, making Sun Quan's mother furious, and she said a lot of bad things about Zhou Yu right in front of Sun Quan. Eventually, she met up with Liu Bei in a temple, and Liu Bei treated her well, making Sun Quan's mother believe that Lady Sun had the perfect husband. Suddenly, Zhao Yun burst in saying that he met some soldiers who were in a plot to kill Liu Bei. Sun Quan's mother glared at Sun Quan who pointed at one of his generals. Sun Quan's mother was going to execute him but Liu Bei intervened.

Liu Bei was sent to Lady Sun's room where he was shocked to see handmaids wielding swords. Liu Bei was afraid of getting killed when Lady Sun showed her face and told the handmaids to go away. Liu Bei and Lady Sun became a happy couple for the next few days enjoying banquet after banquet. Zhao Yun then opened the second bag, and he told Liu Bei that Cao Cao was attacking. Liu Bei consulted Lady Sun, and they decided to leave for Jing Province together. Sun Quan was furious, and he sent Zhou Tai to attack. Zhou Yu also heard the news and sent Xu Sheng and Ding Feng. Xu Sheng and Ding Feng blocked Liu Bei, and Zhao Yun opened the third bag. Zhao Yun and Liu Bei talked, and Lady Sun was invited to talk with the two generals. She harshly rebuked them, and the two generals were regretful and let Liu Bei and Lady Sun go. They reached a river, where Zhou Yu's massive fleet chased them, but the newlywed couple was saved by Zhuge Liang's own fleet. Zhou Yu was defeated by Zhuge Liang and his wound burst open in anger.

Zhuge Liang angers Zhou Yu a third time
At the same time, Cao Cao's generals were showing off their prowess at a stadium while Cao Cao watched with glee. Cao Hong and Wen Ping shot a bullseye to get the Red cloak. Zhang He thought of that feat as unimpressive and was able to hit the bullseye backward. Xiahou Yuan scoffed and arched his back backwards and shot the bullseye. But even that was not enough, for Xu Huang shot the thread connecting the cloak to the branch and took the cloak for his own. Even more surprisingly, Xu Chu rode and plucked Xu Huang off the ground and took the cloak as his own. All the generals started tussling from the cloak until it became torn in pieces. Cao Cao laughed and rewarded each general with pieces of rare silk, while the officials composed poems crediting Cao Cao's services to the Han.

Just then, he received news that Liu Bei had conquered Jing Province and was frightened. Advisor Cheng Yu could not understand why, and Cao Cao explained that Liu Bei conquering Jing Province was like a dragon taking flight. Cao Cao then thought of a plan to sow discord between Liu Bei and Sun Quan by appointing Zhou Yu as the leader of Nanchun, the area in Jing Province Zhou Yu previously failed to take. Zhou Yu accepted, and sent Lu Su to take Jing Province as he was the leader of it now.

Lu Su then entered and asked Liu Bei to return Jing again. However, Liu Bei broke into tears and Zhuge Liang explained that Liu Bei was of the same family as Liu Zhang, and he did not want to attack. Lu Su was so filled with emotion that he nodded and left. He told the news to Zhou Yu, who was enraged. Zhou Yu met up with Zhuge Liang and asked if he could enter Liu Bei's territory with the excuse of wanting to help them invade Liu Zhang. Liu Bei declined, and the poison arrow acted again. On board his massive fleet, he wrote a letter to Sun Quan appointing Lu Su as his successor. His famous last words, "既生瑜何生亮“ translates to "If Zhou Yu has come down to earth why must Zhuge Liang come too?".

Zhuge Liang, accompanied by Zhao Yun, came and delivered a speech at Zhou Yu's funeral, questioning why Zhou Yu had to be so envious and that he should not have died at such a young age. After the speech, he burst into tears and the crowd followed suit.

Pang Tong impresses Zhang Fei using wit
After Zhou Yu died, Lu Su became head advisor and recommended the fledgling phoenix Pang Tong to Sun Quan. However, during the interview, Pang Tong spoke rudely and disrespectfully of the late commander, enraging Sun Quan such that he remained unemployed.

Lu Su questioned Sun Quan why he rejected the man who came up with the chain scheme at Chibi, so Sun Quan resorted to sophistry to reply. Knowing that Pang Tong had no hope in Wu, Lu Su recommended him to Liu Bei. Zhuge Liang met up with Lu Su, and the two wrote edicts stating Pang Tong's great talents. Pang Tong dressed up poorly in his interview with Liu Bei, so he was assigned a minor office. Pang Tong spent a hundred days doing nothing, only loitering and drinking heavily, upsetting Liu Bei.

Liu Bei was suspicious of Pang Tong and sent Zhang Fei and Sun Qian to check on Pang Tong. Zhang Fei intended to execute Pang Tong, but Sun Qian checked him and let Pang Tong speak for himself. Zhang Fei admonished Pang Tong for drinking wine all day and not contributing to society. He then scolded Pang Tong, saying he only knew about drinks. Pang Tong chuckled and told Zhang Fei that he could do those three months worth of investigation in one day. Zhang Fei did not believe and rented a building for Pang Tong to solve a huge stack of books regarding crimes that had happened. Pang Tong took his time and cleared the books by half day.

Zhang Fei was impressed and reported Pang Tong's knowledge to Liu Bei. Liu Bei was impressed and immediately invited Pang Tong over for a banquet. Zhuge Liang then revealed his plan to Liu Bei and Pang Tong was promoted as soon as he arrived. Later, Zhuge Liang asked Pang Tong why he did not show his and Lu Su's edicts to Liu Bei. Pang Tong said that he did not want Liu Bei to rely on others opinion about him, but rather see his talents for himself. Zhuge Liang then made Pang Tong his assistant and the two started discussing where to go from here.

Cao Cao loses his cloak and trims his beard
Cao Cao wanted to execute Ma Teng for participating in Dong Cheng's campaign against him. Thus, advisor Xun Yu luring Ma Teng into the capital province and execute him. Ma Teng was dubious and thus he brought along his cousins Ma Xiu, Ma Dai and Ma Tie. At the capital, Ma Teng's plot was accidentally slipped by his friend Huang Kui, and Cao Cao immediately sent Cao Hong, Xu Huang and Xu Chu to attack. In the chaos, Ma Tie was killed by an arrow while Ma Xiu was made prisoner. Ma Teng was captured along with the blundering Huang Kui. The latter had his whole family captured. Ma Dai escaped by luck. The prisoners were all executed.

Ma Teng's best friend, Han Sui and Ma Teng's son, Ma Chao, wanted to kill Cao Cao. They received support from Liu Bei and Lu Su, the former sending a letter encouraging attack to avenge Ma Teng. Thus, they advanced all the way to Changan and surrounded it.

However, the walls stood firm and they could not get past the moat. General Pang De suggested feigning a retreat, which Ma Chao did. The defender, Zhong You then opened the gates. Five days later, Ma Chao launched a surprise attack and Pang De slew Zhong You's brother Zhong Jin. Ma Chao set fire to Changan and Zhong You fled to Tong pass.

Cao Cao, learning of this failure, immediately sent Cao Hong and Xu Huang to hold the pass. Cao Ren advised against it, stating that Cao Hong was rash and that they could not hold the pass if he is drawn out to fight. Cao Cao trusted Cao Hong and turned a deaf ear to Cao Ren's advice. After 10 days of abuse from the defenders, Cao Hong could not take it anymore. Xu Huang had been controlling him for the past few days, but now he was checking the supplies, so Cao Hong took the opportunity to attack. Just then, Ma Dai blocked the retreat as Ma Chao and Pang De attacked Cao Hong on two sides. Cao Hong could not resist the assault and gave up Tong pass to retreat. Pang De went in pursuit, but was halted by Cao Ren. Cao Cao wanted to executed Cao Hong, but his colleagues pleaded and Cao Cao finally relented.

Cao Cao himself went to try and recover Tong pass. He was inpressed by Ma Chao's stature. Cao Cao sent Yu Jin to challenge Ma Chao, but he was defeated. Zhang He was defeated too. Li Tong was killed in the first bout. Then, the army of Ma Chao swept upon Cao Cao as Ma Chao went in pursuit of Cao Cao. Ma Chao shouted, "The man in red is Cao Cao!" Cao Cao threw off his Red cloak. "The long bearded man is Cao Cao!" Cao Cao trimmed his beard. "The short bearded man is Cao Cao!" Cao Cao hastily wore a mask. Ma Chao struck Cao Cao but missed and hit a tree. Ma Chao came again, but Cao Hong ran up and fought valiantly, protecting Cao Cao. When Cao Hong was about to die, Xiahou Yuan came to the rescue.

Xu Chu strips down for a fight with Ma Chao
When Cao Cao was safe, the army of Ma Chao hurled abuse. Cao Cao sent Xu Huang to set up an ambush, but Ma Chao predicted it and won another battle. Cao Cao and his bodyguard Xu Chu reached a river, and Xu Chu found a boat. As the archers of Ma Chao fired, Xu Chu held one shield to protect Cao Cao and used his other hand to row as quickly as he could. Cao Cao was so scared he gripped Xu Chu's leg and hid behind him for protection. Xu Chu had worn his double army that day, so he was fortunate not to have been fatally injured. All the other boatman had been killed, and Xu Chu was heavily wounded. Fortunately, they landed safely, and Ma Chao was impressed by Xu Chu's bravery amd strength.

Ma Chao then decided to do a night raid on Cao Cao's supply depot. Cao Cao suspected it and placed an ambush, but Ma Chao's force was able to stop the soldiers lying in ambush, and the camps were all burnt to the ground. Cao Cao then quickly shifted the remaining supplies to act as a barrier, but Ma Chao countered it by ordering all his soldiers to burn the barrier down. Cao Cao's army suffered heavily. To protect themselves from Ma Chao, advisor Xun Yu suggested building temporary walls of soil. However, the soil in the area was sandy and always fell down, so Cao Cao was in a dilemma. Just then, an old man suggested a plan to build some walls. It was Nearing winter, so Cao Cao poured water in the soil. The water froze into ice, so the walls became mixture of soil and ice.

When Cao Cao went to check the walls, he only went out with Xu Chu. Ma Chao suddenly came and blocked the road. Xu Chu and Ma Chao then came to an agreement that they would fight the next day. The next day, Ma Chao and Xu Chu fought. Cao Cao remarked that Ma Chao was as good as Lü Bu. The two fought for a good hundred bouts, and Xu Chu seemed to be worsted.

Xu Chu was hit by Ma Chao and he paced backwards, changing his weapon and  stripping off his armour. Then, the fight continued, and it became so vigorous that the two battlers broke each other's weapons and they engaged in hand combat. Cao Cao was afraid for Xu Chu and sent Xiahou Yuan and Cao Hong to assist Xu Chu. Han Sui sent  Ma Dai and Pang De to help Ma Chao. Then, the army of Han Sui fell upon Cao Cao, and Xu Chu and the warriors were called back to retreat. Cao Cao suffered yet another failure.

Another day, Cao Cao saw Ma Chao throw his helmet to the ground in rage and say that if Cao Cao was still alive he would die a tragic end. This enraged Xiahou Yuan and he attacked Ma Chao. Cao Cao was afraid for Xiahou Yuan and came up to check. When Ma Chao saw  Cao Cao, he cast aside Xiahou Yuan  and chased Cao Cao. The army of Cao Cao suffered yet another failure and Cao Cao escaped barely. Ma Chao heard rumours that Xu Huang was going to attack his rear so he retreated. His rear was attacked by surprise and he suffered greatly. Back at camp, he struggled to know what to do. Han Sui suggested ceding the conquered territory for peace, and Ma Chao agreed. Cao Cao was informed of the deal, and he replied that he would answer tomorrow. Advisor Jia Xu suggested agreeing, and he thought of a plan to sow discord between Ma Chao and Han Sui.

Ma Chao fights a great battle
Cao Cao then lured Han Sui and Ma Chao over to his territory. Cao Cao announced that he wanted to talk with Han Sui, so the two rode over to each other. Cao Cao reminded Han Sui of the times when they were young and good friends. Then, Cao Cao left, leaving Han Sui confused. Ma Chao asked what happened, and Han Sui told what had happened. Ma Chao was confused and suspicious.

Cao Cao, at Jia Xu's advice, wrote a letter to Han Sui, intentionally cancelling many words. When Ma Chao knew Han Sui received a letter, he came to check, and saw the cancellations. He asked Han Sui why there were so many cancellations, and Han Sui denied knowing. Ma Chao thought he had purposely changed what Cao Cao wrote to keep himself at ease, so he grew more suspicious.

Ma Chao told his suspicions with Han Sui, who blamed Cao Cao for writing so many errors. Ma Chao furiously replied that Cao Cao was a careful man and would not make so many mistakes, and that Han Sui was trying to hide the truth from him. Han Sui said that tomorrow, if Ma Chao still did not believe, he would lure Cao Cao out and let Ma Chao kill Cao Cao. The next day, Han Sui asked for Cao Cao, but received Cao Hong, who said not to forget what Cao Cao told him to do. Ma Chao was enraged and was going to kill Han Sui right then, but his own soldiers checked him. Han Sui said he would not rebel, but Ma Chao still did not believe and went away resentfully.

Han Sui then decided to consult his generals, and they all agreed to surrender to Cao Cao, lest Ma Chao kill them. Han Sui wrote a letter about surrendering and sent Yang Qiu to give the letter to Cao Cao. Yang Qiu came back and Han Sui started planning. They decided to invite Ma Chao to a banquet and kill him there. Just then, the eavesdropping Ma Chao rushed in and tried to kill Han Sui. Han Sui's five great generals attacked Ma Chao at once, allowing Han Sui to run.

Ma Chao cut down Ma Ruan and Liang Xing while the other three fled. When Ma Chao tried to find Han Sui, Ma Dai and Pang De came to say that Han Sui had already surrendered to Cao Cao. The three fought the whole of Han Sui's army, and just then, Cao Cao's army swept upon them. The three fled for their lives. By twilight, they were still pursued. Just then, Li Kan, Cao Cao's general, attacked Ma Chao and fell back quickly. Ma Chao pursued Li Kan, when Yu Jin arrived and shot Ma Chao. Ma Chao endured and killed Li Kan. Ma Chao then caught up with Ma Dai and Pang De. Then, Ma Chao's horse was shot and Ma Chao fell to the ground.

Just when he was about to be trampled upon, Ma Dai and Pang De blocked the attackers and the three fought their way out. Cao Cao drove his men by placing a high bounty on Ma Chao's head. Finally, all of Cao Cao's soldiers were exhausted and Cao Cao gave up on the pursuit.

Zhang Song produces a map
Relations between Liu Bei and Sun Quan deteriorated after Zhou Yu's death, but not to the point of war. After Zhou Yu died, Liu Bei had all of Liu Zhang's trust. Liu Zhang was the ruler of Yi Province and was a coward. He was afraid of Cao Cao, so his advisor Zhang Song advised him to give presents to Cao Cao. Cao Cao did not like the ugly Zhang Song. When Cao Cao boasted that he had settled all of China, Zhang Song immediately replied that Liu Bei and Sun Quan were still strong enemies at large and could take down Cao Cao when combined. Cao Cao was angered, and sent him out of the building. Zhang Song met up with a scholar Yang Xiu, and Zhang Song impressed Yang Xiu by being able to memorise Cao Cao's book on army tactics after one read. Then, Zhang Song said that this wasn't Cao Cao's book, and that children in Shu all learnt to memorise these books. Yang Xiu then reported back to Cao Cao and told him of Zhang Song's brilliance. Furious, Cao Cao threw his book into a flaming pot.

Then, the next morning, Zhang Song was invited to a public speech. He humiliated Cao Cao again and Cao Cao's soldiers beat him up on Cao Cao's orders. Cao Cao then forced him out of the capital. On the way, Zhang Song went into Liu Bei's territory. He was treated so well by Liu Bei that he gave Liu Bei a very detailed map of Yi Province and advised him to take over Yi Province. Liu Bei agreed. When Liu Zhang found out, he executed Zhang Song. The fledging phoenix, Pang Tong was able to sneakily get into Yi Province and claim a large portion of it by befriending Liu Zhang's scholars Fa Zheng. Liu Bei then started attacking Zhang Lu, who threatened to attack Liu Zhang. Sun Quan then sent a letter to Liu Zhang, saying that Liu Bei was bound to betray him. Liu Zhang then cut off Liu Bei's supplies and turned to attacking him. Attacked by two fronts, Liu Bei struggled and eventually broke through.

Huang Zhong and Wei Yan compete for glory
Since Liu Bei was on a campaign against Liu Zhang and his forces were concentrated there, Sun Quan wanted to attack Jing and take it. However, his mother disagreed as she was worried about the safety of Lady Sun. Hence, Zhang Zhao came up with a plan to retrieve Lady Sun and Liu Bei's son using a spy planted in Jing. However, Zhao Yun was able to kill the spy and retrieve the son and was fetched by Zhang Fei who destroyed the giant fleet Wu had brought over. Lady Sun landed safely in Wu, but Sun Quan was not safe, for Cao Cao started launching attack after attack on Wu to take revenge after Red Cliff. Ultimately, they were futile and Sun Quan still held the advantage over such naval battles.

The fledging phoenix Pang Tong proposed three choices to Liu Bei. The first was to attack Liu Zhang head-on and extract troops from Jing Province. The second was to kill off all the generals guarding the entrances of Yi Province and get into Yi. His final proposal was to just not attack Yi Province at all. Liu Bei was instantly reminded of the Longzhong plan and rejected the third proposal. After some thinking, he knew that the first could be very dangerous as Cao Cao or Sun Quan could take Jing Province while it was less defended. Thus, he decided on the second option.

Huang Zhong and the rebellious Wei Yan fought to achieve dominance over their campaigns. They became good friends after Huang Zhong saved Wei Yan from certain death. One day, Pang Tong's horse started acting weirdly and Liu Bei volunteered to switch horses with him. Then, they both split paths. Pang Tong, riding Liu Bei's famous white steed, was mistaken for Liu Bei by hidden archers. After Wei Yan quickly passed a narrow valley, Pang Tong was alone with a few soldiers, and the archers killed him. Liu Bei greatly mourned this death. Since Pang Tong died, Zhuge Liang, who was in Jing Province, had to come over to assist in using strategies to defeat Liu Zhang. Since Zhuge Liang was not at Jing anymore, Guan Yu and his subordinates Guan Ping, Zhou Cang, and Liao Hua volunteered themselves to defend Jing.

Zhang Fei duels with Ma Chao
Zhang Fei was sent to replace Pang Tong. Liu Bei sent him to attack the old general Yan Yan. Zhang Fei brought with him a huge menacing force with him. Yan Yan's camps were heavily guarded on mountainous terrain, and Zhang Fei knew it would not be easy to get in. Thus, he sent someone to talk surrender with Yan Yan. Yan Yan instantly refused and sent the messenger back to Zhang Fei severely injured. Zhang Fei was enraged and attacked, but suffered a defeat as the archers stood on the walls of the gates and pinned down the soldiers.

A few days later, Zhang Fei noticed a small entrance to the city from the back. Yan Yan had planned for Zhang Fei to enter from there. At night, Zhang Fei's soldiers came into the forest which led to the entrance, when they met up with a resistance force led by Yan Yan. However, Zhang Fei and more soldiers paved their own path and flanked Yan Yan. Trapped in the midst of soldiers, he was bound up, and brought to the city that was captured. He met up with Zhang Fei, who ordered him to kneel down. Yan Yan refused, and Zhang Fei flew into a rage. Yan Yan then stretched out his neck for the blade. Zhang Fei then realised Yan Yan was a man of virtue. Impressed, he spared Yan Yan. Yan Yan was touched as well and knowing his lord Liu Zhang was weak, defected to Zhang Fei. Yan Yan was familiar with the landscape of Yi Province and was successful in claiming many large chunks of Yi Province.

The warlord Zhang Lu went to attack Liu Zhang and sent Ma Chao to attack Zhang Fei. Zhang Fei met Ma Chao's cousin Ma Dai, and mocked him, saying he could only fight Ma Chao because Ma Dai was too weak. Ma Dai was offended and started to attack, but Zhang Fei was too strong and Ma Dai retreated. Then, Ma Chao came out, and Zhang Fei boasted that Ma Chao would be down after ten bouts. The battle ended in a tie, after fighting more than a hundred bouts. Zhuge Liang then told Zhang Lu that they would stop attacking if Ma Chao came back. Zhang Lu was delighted and sent Ma Chao back. However, Ma Chao did not listen and continued fighting Zhang Fei the next day. Zhang Lu, distrustful of Ma Chao, suddenly received news that Ma Chao was coming back. Zhang Lu grew afraid that Ma Chao was going to take over him and close the city gates. Then, Zhuge Liang transferred the news to Ma Chao, told him about Liu Bei's motive to restore the Han dynasty, and convinced him to defect to Liu Bei.

Thinking that no one could stop Ma Chao, Liu Zhang surrendered. Zhang Lu was attacked by Cao Cao later and sent his best general Pang De to fight. Pang De was able to fend off Xu Chu and Xu Huang at the same time, and only after many score bouts was he defeated. Cao Cao treated his captive well and Pang De turned on Zhang Lu to serve Cao Cao. Zhang Lu was easily defeated and was executed.

Zhang Liao, Gan Ning and Zhou Tai show off their prowess at He Fei
Seeing that Cao Cao was focused on the west, Sun Quan forces, led by Gan Ning, the veteran naval commander and pirate, attacked He Fei, one of Cao Cao's bases. Cao Cao panicked and sent Zhang Liao, Yue Jin, and Li Dian to rescue He Fei. The three arrived late, and one of the cities was already taken down, crushing their morale. Cao Cao told Zhang Liao to let Li Dian with him to attack the army camp while Yue Jin stay to defend. Zhang Liao and Li Dian were never on friendly terms. However, Zhang Liao was able to convince an upset Li Dian to raid the camp with him. Zhang Liao only had 800 men with him, but they were inspired by his bravery, and scored a major victory against Sun Quan. The rescue captains Gan Ning and Lü Meng were stopped by Li Dian and Sun Quan barely escaped with his life. From then on, Zhang Liao became a story that parents told to their naughty children to make them behave.

During a banquet to celebrate their victory over Cao Cao's forces at Wan County, Ling Tong feels jealous when he sees Lü Meng praising Gan Ning so he offers to perform a sword dance and wants to use the opportunity to kill Gan Ning and avenge his father, who had been killed by Gan Ning. Gan Ning senses Ling Tong's intention so he also offers to perform with his pair of jis. When Lü Meng realises that they are about to get into a fight, he draws his sword, carries a shield and stands in the middle to separate them. When Sun Quan hears about the incident, he comes to the banquet hall, orders them to lay down their weapons, and chides them for fighting among themselves. As Ling Tong kneels down and weeps, Sun Quan tries to calm him down and repeatedly urges him to stop provoking Gan Ning. Ling Tong never felt happy with Gan Ning, after Gan Ning's strategy of doing a night raid worked better than his proposal of attacking head-on that failed. Sun Quan was so pleased with Gan Ning that he said, "Cao Cao has his Zhang Liao but I have my Gan Ning!" Later, during another duel, Zhang Liao sent Yue Jin to fight Ling Tong. The fight lasted 50 bouts with neither getting the better. Just then, Cao Xiu shot an arrow at Ling Tong, causing him to fall, and just as Yue Jin was about to kill him, an arrow hit Yue Jin in the face, allowing Ling Tong to retreat. Ling Tong then learnt that it was Gan Ning who shot him, and the enmity between them ended.

Sun Quan then went on another expedition, but Zhang Liao had long came up with an ambush, and Sun Quan was stuck in the middle of a massive battle. Sun Quan's general Dong Xi drowned, while Chen Wu was killed in the chaos. Just then, another general named Zhou Tai ran into the conflict, guided Sun Quan out of the chaos. When Zhou Tai realised that Sun Quan was not with him, he ran back into the chaos and saved him. Then, he realised another major general, Xu Sheng, was not out of the chaos, so he ran back and saved him. To reward Zhou Tai, Sun Quan invited him to a banquet, made him show all his wounds to everyone and tell them where he got each wound from. Then, for each wound, Sun Quan poured him a glass of wine. He was treated by advanced physician Hua Tuo.

Liu Bei is crowned the Prince
By then, Liu Bei ruled over a vast stretch of land from Yi Province to southern Jing Province; these territories later served as the foundation of the state of Shu Han. Zhuge Liang advised Liu Bei to attack the crucial city of Hanzhong and expand north. Zhang Fei was sent to defeat Zhang He's base. He lured Zhang He into the open and surrounded his base. Zhang He never went out from then on, to Zhang Fei's frustration. As he had no resources for a siege, Zhang Fei drank and drank every day. Liu Bei was worried but Zhuge Liang suspected trickery and ordered more wine be sent to Zhang Fei. Soon, Zhang Fei shared all his wine with all his soldiers. Zhang He wanted to go on a night raid, but his soldiers had little spirit left in them. Zhang Fei's contended soldiers trapped Zhang He in an ambush, and it was not a little number of casualties that Zhang He suffered while escaping.

Huang Zhong and Yan Yan, the two aged generals, were mocked for wanting to defeat Xiahou Yuan's base. Xiahou Yuan was a veteran general at the same level as Guan Yu, but Zhuge Liang knew that they would win and let them go. True enough, Xiahou Yuan was flanked by Yan Yan, and while he tried to escape, was killed by Huang Zhong. Cao Cao was deeply grieved by Xiahou Yuan's death. Huang Zhong would be caught in an ambush, but Zhao Yun saved him.

Seeing the situation of Hanzhong grow dire every day, Cao Cao grew melancholy. One day, Cao Cao was eating some chicken when Xiahou Dun came to ask what was the message to pass to the soldiers. Cao Cao absent-mindedly said, "Chicken ribs".Cao Cao's scholar Yang Xiu interpreted it as a sign of retreat and ordered the soldiers to pack their bags. Cao Cao did not actually want to retreat, so he executed Yang Xiu for passing wrong orders. However, a few days later Zhao Yun took Hanzhong, and Ma Chao defeated all of Cao Cao's reinforcements. Cao Cao regretted not listening to Yang Xiu.

Liu Bei declared himself the Prince of Hanzhong.  At the same time, Emperor Xian awarded Cao Cao the title of a vassal king – King of Wei – while Sun Quan was known as the Duke of Wu. Hanzhong bore much significance to Liu Bei as this was the first piece of land that Liu Bang, the first ruler of the Han dynasty owned. Now, the first step of the Longzhong plan was complete, and Zhuge Liang's prediction of the three kingdoms formation was correct.

Battle of Fancheng

Liu Bei announced that Guan Yu, Zhang Fei, Zhao Yun, Ma Chao, and Huang Zhong, a defective general originally from Wu, would be honored as the five tiger generals. Liu Bei had already conquered Yi Province and was willing to surrender Jing Province. However, Guan Yu refused to hand Jing Province over. Hence, Lu Su and the official Lü Meng hatched a plan. They invited Guan Yu to a banquet in Jing Province and drank and drank. Guan Yu drank until he was too drunk to fight. Guan Yu felt many movements behind his chair and realized it was an ambush. He then announced that he was full, and would like Lu Su to take him back. Lu Su then sighed, knowing the plan failed. Lu Su brought Guan Yu back to the ship and none of the soldiers dared to attack while Guan Yu held Lu Su hostage. Lü Meng was furious. Lu Su eventually died of illness.

After winning a naval battle against Sun Quan, Cao Cao sent Cao Ren and Pang De to Fancheng, Cao Cao's newly occupied territory in Jing Province. Guan Yu, who was tasked to guard Jing Province by Zhuge Liang, grew ambitious and wanted to get the strategic Fancheng for himself. Guan Yu defeated Cao Ren and Cao Ren retreated. Guan Yu and Pang De fought in a one-on-one battle. After a few rounds, Guan Yu was winning, so Pang De turned around and ran while Guan Yu pursued. Pang De then turned around and grabbed his coffin. Before the battle, Pang De had promised Cao Cao that he would come back with either Guan Yu or himself in the coffin. Not willing to keep himself in the coffin, Pang De opened his coffin to reveal many arrows. Guan Yu avoided all but one that struck him in the head and nearly killed him. Guan Yu was forced to retreat. A few days later, the Han river overflowed, and Pang De was caught in a flood and surrounded by Guan Yu's fleet. Unwilling to surrender, he was executed.

Defeat at Maicheng
Meanwhile, Sun Quan plotted to take Jing Province after growing tired of Guan Yu's repeated refusals to hand over the province. He secretly made peace and allied with Cao Cao against Liu Bei. Sun Quan replaced his general Lü Meng with an underachiever named Lu Xun, who suggested attacking Jing Province while Guan Yu was still at Fancheng. Guan Yu's generals all feared Guan Yu. Lu Xun knew they would instantly surrender.

Guan Yu, learning that Jing Province was being attacked, retreated from Fancheng, but was caught off guard by Lü Meng and had already lost Jing Province before he knew it. Lü Meng treated the people well, and family members of Guan Yu's soldiers were asked to come back. With his army's morale falling and the troops gradually deserting, Guan Yu and his remaining men withdrew to Maicheng, where they were surrounded by Sun Quan's forces. Guan Yu asked help from Liu Bei's adopted son, Liu Feng, but he sent no troops and supplies, so Guan Yu attempted to break out of the siege but failed and was captured in an ambush. Sun Quan had him executed after he refused to surrender.

After Guan Yu's death, many sombre events happen. Blood leaks from trees at Maicheng, and the Red Hare perished, refusing to be served food by someone who was not Guan Yu. Zhou Cang also committed suicide for the same reason and Liao Hua became a prisoner of war. At a banquet, Lü Meng suddenly attacked Sun Quan, screaming that he was in fact Guan Yu and he was going to eat Sun Quan alive. Bleeding from many body parts, Lü Meng collapsed to the ground, possessed by Guan Yu's spirit. Sun Quan was traumatised, and decided to give Guan Yu's head to Cao Cao.

When Liu Bei heard of Guan Yu's death, He collapsed onto the ground, blood leaking out of his mouth. He refused to eat or drink for days until he got sick.

Cao Pi usurps the throne

Sun Quan gave Guan Yu's head to Cao Cao, who wanted to transfer the blame for Guan Yu's death to Cao Cao and appease Liu Bei. Cao Cao's official Sima Yi knew that, and advised Cao Cao to give Guan Yu a lavish burial. Cao Cao, who respected Guan Yu's bravery and virtue, did so. However, Cao Cao started having bad dreams about Guan Yu's spirit and ordered his physician, Hua Tuo, to find out about his illness. Hua Tuo figured that Cao Cao had brain tumor and wanted to cut open his head to heal him. Hua Tuo had good means, but Cao Cao was suspicious because previously, his other doctor had tried to poison him after joining forces with Dong Cheng. Thus, Cao Cao executed Hua Tuo.

Shortly after Guan Yu's death, Cao Cao died in Luoyang, haunted by Guan Yu's spirit. His son and successor, Cao Pi, forced Emperor Xian to abdicate the throne to him and established the state of Cao Wei to replace the Han dynasty. About a year later, Liu Bei declared himself emperor and founded the state of Shu Han as a continuation of the Han dynasty. Cao Pi arranged a funeral for Cao Cao, but his brother Cao Zhi was busy drinking wine and sleeping and refused to come. Cao Pi was furious that Cao Zhi was not filial and wanted to execute him. So, he gave Cao Zhi a test. If Cao Zhi could not compose a poem about brothers in seven paces, he would be executed. Cao Zhi was also not allowed to use the word 'brother' in the entire poem. Surprisingly, Cao Zhi was able to compose the poem and Cao Pi felt guilty for trying to kill Cao Zhi so he broke into tears and apologized to his brother. Cao Pi lost many naval battles against Sun Quan and lost generals like Xiahou Dun, Zhang Liao, and Cao Ren to illnesses, so Cao Pi was anxious to launch a full invasion against Wu and instead treated Sun Quan well and installed him as a vassal. This bad move would haunt the Cao family forever. Many historians felt that this move prevented the Cao family from conquering the whole of China.

While Liu Bei was planning to avenge Guan Yu, Zhang Fei was mobilising a strong army to attack Wu. He treated his soldiers harshly and gave them undoable demands, forcing them to do it all in 3 days. His subordinate Zhang Da believed it to be impossible so he was flogged 50 times by Zhang Fei. Zhang Da could not take it anymore and killed him in the night and fled. When news of Zhang Fei's death reached Liu Bei, he fainted on the floor

Liu Bei loses a tiger at Yiling
As Liu Bei led a large army to avenge Guan Yu and retake Jing Province, Sun Quan attempted to appease him by offering to return him the territories in southern Jing Province. Liu Bei's subjects urged him to accept Sun Quan's offer but Liu insisted on avenging his sworn brother. Liu Bei made Guan Xing and Zhang Bao his captains. Guan Xing and Zhang Bao both wanted to be the first, and were constantly fighting. Liu Bei made them have peace and suggested them to become sworn brothers. From then on, Guan Xing and Zhang Bao were always together.

Sun Quan, noticing Liu Bei's large army, sent his favourite, Sun Huan, to attack. Liu Bei and his army, led by Guan Xing and Zhang Bao, defeated Sun Huan with much ease. Sun Huan was easily captured as he awaited execution. While all the chaos happened, Guan Xing got lost in a battle and was saved from the enemy by the spirit of his father. He resided at an old man's house and the old man protected him. Suddenly, Guan Yu's captor came into the house, looking for refuge after being recently defeated. Instinctively, Guan Xing grabbed his sword and cut off the head of the captor and took his father's weapon guandao as his own. The head of Zhang Fei's killer was sent to Liu Bei to appease him, and altars were created in honour of Guan Yu and Zhang Fei.

Liu Bei hosted a banquet to celebrate the good victories. During the banquet, very drunk, he lamented that his generals had gone old and weary, offending Huang Zhong. Thus, Huang Zhong set off on his own and had many victories, but he was shot in the back during a fight and retreated. When he arrived back at camp severely injured, Liu Bei received him with tears. As Huang Zhong was old, his skin was thin and the wound was very serious. Huang Zhong died at night, nearly 80 years old, and Liu Bei lost the third of his five tiger generals.

Lu Xun sets fire to all of Liu Bei's camps; Liu Bei advises Zhuge Liang about the future
The reserve army, led by Gan Ning was defeated and Gan Ning died under a tree. The army advanced, but could not cope with the hot weather. Liu Bei saw a very long forest and decided to line up all his camps under the shade to save the soldiers from the heat. By then, Lu Xun was the new captain and when he saw it, he laughed and cherished this moment. When Zhuge Liang was informed of the arrangement of the camps, he stared in shock and said, "All the dreams the king had will vanish due to this!" He sent Zhao Yun to lead a reserve army to save Liu Bei.

At night, Lu Xun set fire to Liu Bei's camps that were in the forest. Liu Bei woke up to the flames and hurriedly put on his armour. All the camps were set ablaze, and soldiers were dying left and right. Suddenly, many arrows fell upon the camps, and Guan Xing and Zhang Bao quickly escorted Liu Bei away as he stared in horror at the number of lives lost. As the three of them went into a narrow path in the forest, Lu Xun cornered them and demanded Liu Bei surrender. Fortunately, Zhao Yun and the reinforcements arrived and Lu Xun was defeated in a duel and fled. Zhao Yun escorted Liu Bei to the nearest city, Baidi, and Liu Bei mourned the massive loss of life during the battle.

Liu Bei was ashamed of his failure and refused to return to the capital. He fell gravely ill and constantly had dreams about the brothers he could not avenge. Knowing that he would die, he called Zhuge Liang, Zhao Yun, his sons, and officers, to his deathbed.

On his deathbed, Liu Bei granted Zhuge Liang permission to take the throne if his son and successor, Liu Shan, proved to be an inept ruler. Zhuge Liang firmly refused and swore to remain faithful to the trust Liu Bei had placed in him. Liu Bei also told Zhuge Liang not to place the latter's favorite, Ma Su, in any important situations, upsetting Zhuge Liang, although he did not show it. Liu Bei told his sons to be virtuous and moral. Lastly, he told Zhao Yun to continue his support for the Han and that the times they spent together were priceless. When Liu Bei closed his eyes, Zhuge Liang and Zhao Yun collapsed onto the floor, weeping.

After Liu Bei's death, Cao Pi induced several forces, including Sun Quan, a turncoat Shu general Meng Da, the Nanman and Qiang tribes, to attack Shu, in coordination with a Wei army.

To defeat all five forces was nearly impossible and Liu Bei's son Liu Shan was already preparing the gifts for surrender when he received news that Zhuge Liang had single-handedly stopped all five armies. Zhuge Liang sent Ma Chao to pacify the Qiang Tribesmen who greatly respected him. He ordered Wei Yan to be his troops deceptively to make the Nanman King Meng Huo think that Zhuge Liang had way more soldiers than his own, so he dared not attack. Meng Da was a friend of Fei Yi, so when Fei Yi asked him to retreat, he did and pretended to be ill. The Wei army led by Cao Zhen could barely pass through the narrow route,  so Zhao Yun easily defended it. The Wu army did not move as the other four armies had stopped.

Capturing and releasing Meng Huo seven times
Zhuge Liang also sent Deng Zhi to make peace with Sun Quan and restore the alliance between Shu and Wu. Zhuge Liang then personally led a southern campaign against the Nanman and appointed rookie generals Zhang Yi and Ma Zhong as captains. Zhao Yun and the veteran general Wei Yan were dissatisfied with their post as reserves and went on their own to attack the Nanman. The Nanman were shocked because their spies reported that Zhuge Liang would only arrive days later. The Nanmans suffered several defeats, and Zhao Yun and Wei Yan came back with a detailed map of the Nanman area and Meng Huo's subordinates. Zhuge Liang was delighted and reappointed them as captains. Zhao Yun captured Meng Huo. Meng Huo refused to surrender, saying he would not surrender by trickery but after a real fight. Hearing these words, Zhuge Liang let him go.

Meng Huo sent the general Dongcha Na to fight the reinforcements led by Ma Dai. They met at a bridge, and Ma Dai scolded Dongcha Na, saying he had no regret for the kindness Zhuge Liang gave him even after being captured. Dongcha Na felt regretful and retreated. Meng Huo, learning of this failure, beat him up severely. Dongcha Na was furious and bound his king up at night. Then, Dongcha Na surrendered Meng Huo to Zhuge Liang.

Meng Huo refused to surrender even after being captured, so he was released. On the third time, Meng Huo sent his brother to pretend to surrender to Zhuge Liang. His actual intention was to kill Zhuge Liang. However, Zhuge Liang tricked Meng Huo's brother into getting drunk, and when Meng Huo tried to launch a surprise attack, he was captured by Zhuge Liang. Meng Huo still refused to surrender. While escaping, he enlisted help from an old friend, but the old friend betrayed him, and his female servants defeated Meng Huo and his brother decisively in a duel and captured him, sending him to Zhuge Liang. Zhuge Liang thanked the female servants and told Meng Huo not to enlist anyone's help if he wanted a real fight. Meng Huo was then released. While Meng Huo was escaping onto a boat, he suddenly realised that the boat was filled with Shu soldiers and was captured again. Meng Huo refused to surrender and was released.

Meng Huo then got help from a wizard who could control the power of animals and summon an animal army. After being frightened by an army of elephants, Zhuge Liang turned a wheelbarrow into a fire-breathing model that looked like a monster. The animals all ran and the wizard was trampled by his elephants. Meng Huo was captured but refused again, so Zhuge Liang released him. Meng Huo then sought help from his wife, Zhu Rong. She was very fit and agile, skilfully using her daggers to capture Zhang Yi and Ma Zhong. Zhao Yun and Wei Yan were sent to capture her. She fought with Zhao Yun toe to toe and sent him running. The same happened to Wei Yan, who taunted her. She was furious and chased Wei Yan into the forest, where she was ambushed by Zhao Yun. Zhao Yun and Wei Yan wrestled with her and bound her up. Zhuge Liang treated her nicely and asked Meng Huo to return the two generals she had captured in return receiving Zhu Rong. Meng Huo accepted.

Meng Huo sought help from a mountaineer who presented his whole army with impenetrable armour. To counter the armour, Zhuge Liang lured Meng Huo's army into a narrow valley and attacked them with the armour's only weakness-fire. Meng Huo, defeated seven times, was released by Zhuge Liang. Meng Huo finally realised Zhuge Liang's kindness and burst into tears, promising not to rebel. Zhuge Liang was heartened and made him in charge of the southern tribes.

Zhuge Liang recruits Jiang Wei with wisdom

After pacifying the south, Zhuge Liang led the Shu army on five military expeditions to attack Wei as part of his mission to restore the Han dynasty. However, Zhuge Liang became fearful of the Wei mastermind Sima Yi, who was extremely clever. He asked his favourite Ma Su how to deal with Sima Yi, and Ma Su had a plan. Zhuge Liang followed the plan and sent spies to Changan, spreading rumours that Sima Yi had rebelled. The plan worked, and Cao Rui, the new king, banished Sima Yi. Then, Zhuge Liang gathered Guan Xing, Zhang Bao, Wei Yan and Deng Zhi to begin the attack. Zhao Yun, who was nearing sixty years old, heard that he was not coming for the mission, and approached Zhuge Liang himself, wanting to go. Zhuge Liang tried all ways to keep him out of the mission and Zhao Yun was considered precious, but Zhao Yun refused, even threatening suicide. Finally, Zhao Yun was allowed to go. Zhao Yun defeated five generals under ten strikes and was going to kill the van leader Xiahou Mao, but had to fall back due to the overpowering force Xiahou Mao had brought. Guan Xing and Zhang Bao came to support Zhao Yun and Xiahou Mao fled for his life.

One of Xiahou Mao's subordinates surrendered to Zhuge Liang because of their large failure-losing five generals-and Zhuge Liang treated him well. The subordinate helped capture Xiahou Mao's spy Cui Liang, who escaped and met up with Xiahou Mao. However, Guan Xing caught up to them, and Cui Liang surrendered Xiahou Mao over to Guan Xing, pretending he helped capture Xiahou Mao. Guan Xing, together with Zhang Bao, flogged Xiahou Mao numerous times. Then, they pretended absent-mindedness and Xiahou Mao escaped.

At this time, Zhuge Liang had sent Guan Xing and Zhang Bao to attack Tianshui while Zhao Yun lay in ambush to confront the enemy on two sides. To Zhuge Liang's surprise, the carefully laid out plan was torn by a general name Jiang Wei, and Zhuge Liang wanted to recruit him. He learnt that Jiang Wei was very filial to his mother. Hence, he sent Wei Yan to surround the city his mother lived in, and Jiang Wei left for the city. Xiahou Mao was then released into Tianshui. Zhuge Liang sent Guan Xing and Zhang Bao to follow behind him back to the camp. When Jiang Wei arrived at the camp, he was denied entry and Xiahou Mao, who had just been released from torture by Guan Xing and Zhang Bao, recognised Guan Xing and Zhang Bao who were following Jiang Wei. The guard shouted to Jiang Wei that he had betrayed them and invited the enemies over. Jiang Wei was perplexed and turned around to finally realise that Guan Xing and Zhang Bao had been following him. Eventually, he surrendered to them.

Zhuge Liang weeps while executing Ma Su

After losing multiple times, Cao Rui saw that the only possible solution to victory was for Sima Yi to come back to power. He made Sima Yi come back, and his first mission was to suppress a rebellion by the turncoat Shu general Meng Da. Zhuge Liang had sent a letter, telling Meng Da to launch a swift attack on Sima Yi lest he arrive quickly. Meng Da ignored and built up his forces. Sima Yi and Xu Huang then launched a swift attack on Meng Da. Meng Da, with his bow, shot the veteran general Xu Huang, who collapsed and was sent back to camp. Sima Yi and his forces broke through the walls and captured Meng Da. Sadly, Xu Huang died in camp, aged fifty-nine. Cao Rui executed Meng Da for trying to rebel.

Zhuge Liang appointed Ma Su to defend Their supply routes at Jieting, a very important mission. Ma Su volunteered himself and said that defeateant the death of bis whiole family. Zhuge Liang sent Wang Ping to accompany Ma Su to check on him, and sent Wei Yan and Zhao Yun to camp nearby lest danger happen. Zhuge Liang digressed to Ma Su that they camp on the road. When Ma Su and Wang Ping arrived at Jieting, Ma Su saw a large hill and wanted to camp there. Wang Ping disagreed amd stated that they should follow Zhuge Liang's advice and camp on the road so that the water supply would not be cut. Ma Su argued that the Art of War stated that the heights were an advantage as they could look over the enemy. Wang Ping was given half a legion to camp on the road while the rest of the soldiers followed Ma Su onto the hill.

When Sima Yi heard that the tiny Jieting was defended, he sighed, for he thought Zhuge Liang would overlook the importance of Jieting. Suddenly, he son Sima Zhao came back to report that the camps were on the hill and not on the road. Sima Yi chuckled and learning that Ma Su was the defender of the camps, chuckled, calling Ma Su a man of false reputation and ordinary talent.

Thus, Sima Yi attacked Jieting's water source, while Zhang He was sent to attack Wang Ping's camps. Since, Wang Ping was given few soldiers, he was easily defeated and fled. Sima Yi and Zhang He surrounded the hill and set fire to the hill. Ma Su, with no water source, could not extin guish the flames and Ma Su was lucky to escape. The soldiers under Wei Yan rescued Ma Su and Wei Yan held the enemy off for as long as he could before fleeing. Zhao Yun, hearing the failure of Ma Su, organised a retreat.

Back at Zhuge Liang's camp, a messenger informed him of the arrangement of the camps, making Zhuge Liang furious. Sima Yi took the opportunity to attack. He became suspicious when he saw Zhuge Liang sitting at the top of a castle by himself playing a zither. The gates were opened and soldiers were pretending to be street cleaners. Suddenly, he heard war drums from inside the camp and feared an ambush, so he called his army to retreat.

Apparently, Zhuge Liang only had 20 000 soldiers compared to his 50 000 soldiers and his campaign collapsed after Ma Su lost at Jieting. The drummers were decoys to strike fear into Sima Yi.Wang Ping amd Wei Yan's platoon arrived, but Zhao Yun had not arrived, making Zhuge Liang worried. Finally, they arrived, and Zhuge Liang remarked that Zhao Yun had not lost a single soldier. Zhao Yun's subordinate Deng Zhi replied that Zhao Yun had moved the soldiers swiftly through the forest while he stayed behind to guard the retreat. Then, they would meet up at the storage area, replenish their hunger, and move safely back to camp. Zhuge Liang wanted to reward Zhao Yun's soldiers with rolls of silk, but Zhao Yun declined, saying that he had failed to achieve success and should not be rewarded. He suggested Zhuge Liang to give the rolls of silk as a gift for winter, and Zhuge Liang agreed.

Ma Su was executed by Zhuge Liang who needed to maintain army discipline. After the execution, Zhuge Liang started weeping, and Wang Ping asked him why he wept for Ma Su. Zhuge Liang replied he was not weeping for Ma Su, but he remembered when Liu Bei was dying he told Zhuge Liang not to use Ma Su in important situations. This touched the whole court who silently wept.

Zhuge Liang's second and third expeditions
When Zhuge Liang was getting ready for the second expedition, he held a banquet with his officials. Suddenly, a bad omen came to the banquet, and Zhuge Liang told them, "This omen means the loss of a great hero." Suddenly, Zhuge Liang received news that Zhao Yun's sons wanted entry, and Zhuge Liang knew Zhao Yun had died. Many temples were created in honour of Zhao Yun, who died of illness, aged sixty-one.

On the second expedition, Zhuge Liang attacked the crucial city of Chencang, but found himself unable to beat one of the city's defenders, Hao Zhao, no matter how hard he tried. Thus, he had to wait for a long time and went into a slight depression when he received news Hao Zhao was ill. Zhuge Liang then ambushed the city. Cao Zhen's reinforcements were late and nothing could be done to safe Chencang as Hao Zhao died. Cao Zhen then bribed the Qiang tribesmen over to assist them, but Guan Xing and Zhang Bao were able to defeat them in a back and forth battle. Wei Yan killed the general Wang Shuang in battle, crushing Cao Zhen's soldier's morale.

Later Sima Yi took over, and appointed Zhang He as his assistant. Sun Quan was persuaded into becoming Emperor, and Zhuge Liang sent presents and rewards to Sun Quan. Lu Xun knew Zhuge Liang's intention was for backup, so he agreed, stealthily waiting for both sides to be exhausted then attack. Zhuge Liang ran out of supplies and was forced to retreat.

On the third expedition, Zhuge Liang captured two crucial cities Wutu and Yinping. Along the way, Sima Yi attacked, but was flanked by Zhang Yi and Wang Ping. Guan Xing routed them, and Sima Yi had to retreat. Later, Zhang Bao died, and Zhuge Liang was so shocked by this that he fell ill, and his army had to retreat. Cao Zhen then made a counter-attack that was foiled due to heavy rain, allowing Zhuge Liang to start another expedition.

Zhuge Liang's fourth expedition
On the fourth expedition, Wei Yan defeated the forces led by Guo Huai. Around this time, Zhuge Liang invented the wooden ox, thought to be an early form of the wheelbarrow, to transport supplies. Cao Zhen fell gravely ill, and Sima Yi was once again sent to defend. Zhuge Liang defeated Guo Huai again, and Zhuge Liang's soldiers were able to collect a lot of supplies, with them being transported very quickly. Zhuge Liang and Sima Yi then faced off, and Zhuge Liang used an outdated strategy, the Bagua formation. He gave it a twist, however, and Sima Yi's army, moving around the defensive Bagua, were routed by a separate army led by Jiang Wei, and when Guan Xing's army arrived, Sima Yi suffered from a horrible defeat. He quickly moved back.

At this time, Zhuge Liang was unhappy that not enough supplies were coming back from the capital. Zhuge Liang found out that it was because the supply transporter Kou An was a drunkard and loitered around the streets, so the supplies came 10 days late.  Zhuge Liang flogged him 80 times, and Kou An, dissatisfied, went to Sima Yi. Sima Yi told him to spread rumours to the weak-willed Liu Shan to tell him to let Zhuge Liang come back. Sima Yi even bribed the head eunuch, Huang Hao, and Huang Hao and Kou An eventually convinced Liu Shan.

Zhuge Liang, on the brink of victory, was called back. Zhuge Liang met Liu Shan at the front gates, and Liu Shan, realizing his error, pretended that he called Zhuge Liang to come back so that he could see his face again. Zhuge Liang told him not to continue lying. Liu Shan was embarrassed, and at Zhuge Liang's suggestion, removed all the eunuchs from power. The high-ranking officials Jiang Wan and Li Yan had their ranking lowered. Zhuge Liang then spent three years mustering his forces to get ready for another campaign.

Zhuge Liang's final campaign
Guan Xing died of illness just before Zhuge Liang's fifth campaign. Zhuge Liang and Sima Yi fought long and hard, and Sima Yi adopted a defensive position.

Around this time, the crafty Zhuge Liang invented the wooden ox, a tool that acted like a wheelbarrow. The wooden oxen was able to quickly transport supplies to the front and Sima Yi wanted it. Hence, he ambushed Shu and took the wooden oxen. He then bade manufacturer's produce more.

When Wang Ping came back to report Sima Yi's theft, Zhuge Liang smiled and revealed that Sima Yi had fallen into Zhuge Liang's trap. Wang Ping soon learnt that the tips of the oxen's tongue must be flapped for the oxen to move, and Sima Yi would not likely figure it out. True enough, Sima Yi had to abandon all his wooden oxen on the road, and Wang Ping collected them back.

Zhuge Liang then thought of a trick. Wei Yan lured Sima Yi into a narrow valley, trapped him and his sons together with his soldiers, and allowed Jiang Wei to throw flaming sticks down at Sima Yi. They nearly killed him and his sons, but rain suddenly fell and Sima Yi was saved. Zhuge Liang was stressed by this unlucky defeat.

Zhuge Liang's days were numbered too because he had been suffering from chronic illness and his condition worsened under stress. He would die of illness at the Battle of Wuzhang Plains while leading a stalemate battle against the Sima Yi. He entrusted Jiang Wei with his books on repeating crossbow on his deathbed. Then, he named Wang Ping, Ma Dai and Zhang Yi the great generals that will continue to lead Shu.

While Jiang Wei was retreating, Sima Yi became convinced that Zhuge Liang was dead. He pursued Jiang Wei's forces, and when Sima Yi caught up, Jiang Wei turned around to show a wooden statue of Zhuge Liang. Due to the lighting, Sima Yi thought the wooden statue was the real Zhuge Liang and sent his whole army to retreat. This incident made the saying, "A dead Zhuge Liang scares a living Sima Yi."

When Jiang Wei was retreating on the way, Wei Yan was dissatisfied, thinking they could easily continue pursuing Sima Yi's retreating forces. Jiang Wei disagreed, stating that the soldiers were exhausted. Wei Yan believed they were not following Zhuge Liang's plan and rebelled, but was cut in the back by Ma Dai.

Sima Yi usurps the throne
In 239, Cao Rui named the 8 year old Cao Fang as his heir. A few weeks later, he fell ill and died. Cao Fang was knew and did not know much, so Cao Zhen's son, Cao Shuang, took over, and ousted Sima Yi from power. He made Sima Yi pretend illness and was not allowed to move. Cao Shuang ruined the court and constantly left the palace to go hunting. Cao Shuang's brother advised him that Sima Yi might takeover, so he sent Li Sheng to check on Sima Yi. Li Sheng soon found out that Sima Yi was gravely ill on his sickbed, nearly deaf and had a lot of memory loss, so he went out to report. Sima Yi was totally fine, and he jumped out of his bed as soon as Li Sheng left. He then took over the military and eventually the whole of Cao Wei. He then held Cao Fang as his own puppet. Cao Shuang was shocked, and went back, thinking he still had the military with him, but was captured and executed.

This move of bringing the Sima's to power was unpopular and Xiahou Yuan's descendant Xiahou Ba, a great general and strategist, defected to Shu. Jiang Wei and Xiahou Ba launched a campaign, but were defeated by Sima Yi and his son Sima Shi. Sima Shi pursued the retreating army, but was trapped in an ambush. Jiang Wei and his soldiers, using the repeating crossbow that Zhuge Liang invented, fired at Sima Shi, who barely escaped alive.

In 251, Sima Yi died of illness, and Sima Shi took over. Sima Shi was tyrannic, and there were many coups to take him out of power. Sima Shi avoided all the coups, and threatened to kill Cao Fang. He removed Cao Fang and replaced him with Cao Mao, whom he thought was smarter. Meanwhile, in Wu, Lu Xun and Zhuge Jin were already dead, and Sun Quan had yet to find a good advisor. He eventually named Sun Liang as his heir and took his favourite, Zhuge Jin's son Zhuge Ke, as his prime minister. Sun Quan died in 252.

Zhuge Ke and Ding Feng defeated Sima Shi in a major battle, and Zhuge Ke grew more popular. Zhuge Ke then attempted to usurp the throne, but was assassinated at a banquet when his ambitions grew clearer. Meanwhile, the warrior Wen Yang and his father declared themselves as rebels and attacked Sima Shi, causing the latter's eye to pop out in shock. Sima Shi's army crushed Wen Yang and his father eventually. He died due to his eye injury and Sima Zhao took over.

Jiang Wei's campaigns
Jiang Wei took over the army after Zhuge Liang's death and constantly did campaigns against Sima Yi. He had the alliance of the Qiang tribesmen. In 240, Jiang Wei led the first expedition, but failed. His fourth expedition was with Xiahou Ba, and they attacked Yong Province. With the Qiang tribesmen, Shu advanced. The two armies led by Guo Huai and Chen Tai knew that the road to Yong Province was a rocky one, and that Jiang Wei did not have enough supplies, and the Qiang would not help them due to this weakness. Chen Tai and Deng Ai then attacked Shu's fortress and brought it down easily, as the Qiang did not come to help.

Jiang Wei's continuous expeditions sucked Shu's resources dry, and the only person trying to stop him, Fei Yi, was assassinated. Guo Huai also died of natural causes. Jiang Wei then launched another expedition, defeating general Wang Jing. Deng Ai wanted to remain defensive, because the Shu army's morale was high after defeating Wang Jing, but Chen Tai said that a swift counter-offensive should be done to defeat Shu just before its morale got higher. Chen Tai sent the reinforcements and was able to lower the siege, and Jiang Wei had no choice but to retreat.

When Jiang Wei attacked again, Deng Ai commented, "The enemy is strong while we are weak. The enemy is ready while our soldiers are new. Third, the enemy is less tired. Fourth, the enemy focuses on attacking Didao only, while we spread our defences over four locations. The enemy would come for the wheat to lower our supplies."Deng Ai intercepted Jiang Wei twice as his foresight had been totally correct.

Fall of Shu
An invasion of Shu begin with Deng Ai and Zhong Hui as the van leaders. Both of them were newly appointed and wanted glory, but they both had different plans. Hence, they agreed to split up. Zhong Hui and his massive force would attack Jiang Wei, while Deng Ai who had less troops would launch an attack on the undefended capital.  Jiang Wei saw the force arriving, and sent a letter to Liu Shan asking for troops. Liu Shan was annoyed as he just wanted to enjoy his life with the eunuch Huang Hao. Huang Hao brought it a prophet, who told them that Wei would fall in a few years time by their hand. Huang Hao persuaded Liu Shan into believing it, and they did nothing. Jiang Wei was furious, and was stuck with only a few troops.

Zhong Hui passed by a mountain, and saw a scary vision there. When he asked his soldiers what mountain that was, the reply was that was where the tomb of Zhuge Liang was. Zhong Hui bowed down to the mountain and continued his journey. When they camped for the night, Zhong Hui had a dream of Zhuge Liang telling him that Shu was gone, and he wanted Zhong Hui to be nice to the people of Shu. Zhong Hui respected Zhuge Liang and did so, many cities surrendered without a fight. Jiang Wei had lost the key area of Hanzhong. His base surrounded, he surrendered.

Deng Ai then invaded Shu, and Liu Shan was nearly gone. He sent Zhuge Liang's son Zhuge Zhan to help defend. Zhuge Zhan called for reinforcements from Wu and wanted to launch a double attack. However, Deng Ai ambushed the two armies, and the reinforcements were slower than Zhuge Zhan's calculations, no matter how fast the reinforcements moved. Deng Ai attacked Zhuge Zhan's base and Zhuge Zhan went out to fight, but was killed in a trap. Zhuge Zhan's son Zhuge Shang went out but was eventually killed. Liu Shan and all his officials wanted to surrender, except his son Liu Shen, hence he went out to fight. He eventually committed suicide. When Deng Ai was on the road, he saw a rock near the bridge that had a phrophecy written by Zhuge Liang carved onto it. It said, "Two fires first set out, Men pass by here, Two soldiers compete, Both soon die." Deng Ai was unable to interpret it, and bowed before the stone and prayed to Zhuge Liang. Liu Shan surrendered to Deng Ai, and was made to stand up by Deng Ai. Liu Shan thanked Deng Ai. Deng Ai wanted to execute Huang Hao, but Huang Hao escaped using bribery. The veteran generals Liao Hua and Zhang Yi committed suicide out of grief for their fallen country.

Jiang Wei's final stand
Jiang Wei wanted to continue Shu and follow Zhuge Liang's footsteps, so he thought of a plan. He conversed with Zhong Hui and drove a wedge between him and Deng Ai. Jiang Wei suggested him to build an empire of his own, so in the middle of the night, Zhong Hui captured Deng Ai and executed him, took control of the military and rebelled. But the soldiers refused to listen to Zhong Hui, and he was killed while Jiang Wei committed suicide. Huang Hao was executed by Sima Zhao.

Sima Zhao moved Liu Shan to Changan and gave him a minor office. To support Wu to surrender, Sima Zhao constantly treated Liu Shan well and gave him banquets. Once, after a performance, Sima Zhao asked Liu Shan, "Do you still miss Shu?" Liu Shan replied, "Every day and night I think about my lost country." Sima Zhao suspected trickery, and said, "Someone told you to say this." To everyone's surprise, Liu Shan replied, "Wow! You even saw through that!. To be honest, I am having too much fun here to think about Shu."

Shortly after the fall of Shu, Sima Zhao died and his son, Sima Yan, forced the last Wei emperor, Cao Huan, to abdicate the throne to him. Sima Yan then established the Jin dynasty to replace the state of Cao Wei, and invaded Wu. The last ruler of Wu, Sun Hao was a tyrant, and nobody wanted to defend him except the prime minister, whose efforts were futile. Thus, in 280, China was finally united under Sima Yan.

Historical accuracy

The novel draws from Chen Shou's Records of the Three Kingdoms as the main historical source. Other major influences include Liu Yiqing's A New Account of the Tales of the World (Shishuo Xinyu), published in 430, and the Sanguozhi Pinghua, a chronological collection of eighty fictional sketches starting with the peach garden oath and ending with Zhuge Liang's death.

Some 50 or 60 Yuan and early Ming plays about the Three Kingdoms are known to have existed, and their material is almost entirely fictional, based on thin threads of actual history. The novel is thus a return to greater emphasis on history, compared to these dramas. The novel also shifted towards better acknowledgement of southern China's historical importance, while still portraying some prejudice against the south. The Qing dynasty historian Zhang Xuecheng famously wrote that the novel was "seven-parts fact and three-parts fiction." The fictional parts are culled from different sources, including unofficial histories, folk stories, the Sanguozhi Pinghua, and also the author's own imagination. Nonetheless, the description of the social conditions and the logic that the characters use is accurate to the Three Kingdoms period, creating "believable" situations and characters, even if they are not historically accurate.

Romance of the Three Kingdoms, like the dramas and folk stories of its day, features Liu Bei and his associates as the protagonists; hence the depiction of the people in Shu Han was glorified. The antagonists, Cao Cao, Sun Quan and their followers, on the other hand, were often denigrated. This suited the political climate in the Ming dynasty, unlike in the Jin dynasty when Cao Wei was considered the legitimate successor to the Han dynasty.

Some non-historical scenes in the novel have become well-known and subsequently became a part of traditional Chinese culture.

Literary analysis

In the introduction to the 1959 reprint of the Brewitt-Taylor translation, Roy Andrew Miller argues that the novel's chief theme is "the nature of human ambition", to which Moody adds the relationship between politics and morality, specifically the conflict between the idealism of Confucian political thought and the harsh realism of Legalism, as a related theme. Other dominant themes of the novel include: the rise and fall of the ideal liege (Liu Bei); finding the ideal minister (Zhuge Liang); the conflict between the ideal liege (Liu Bei) and the consummate villain (Cao Cao); and the cruelties and injustice of feudal or dynastic government.

The opening lines of the novel, "The empire, long divided, must unite; long united, must divide. Thus it has ever been", added by Mao Lun and Mao Zonggang in their recension, epitomise the tragic theme of the novel. One recent critic notes that the novel takes political and moral stands and lets the reader know which of the characters are heroes and which villains, yet the heroes are forced to make a tragic choice between equal values, not merely between good and evil. The heroes know that the end of the empire is ordained by this cosmic cycle of division and unity, yet their choices are moral, based on loyalty, not political.

Plaks states the novel deals with the "cyclical theories of dynastic decline," and relates the "breakdown of order" at the end of the Han dynasty to "the improper exercise of imperial authority, the destabilisation influence of special-interest groups (eunuchs, imperial clansmen), the problem of factional and individual idealism carried to the point of civil strife-all of which eventually surface in the body of the narrative."  He goes on to say, the "overlapping claims to legitimacy and multiple spheres of power," give the novel a "sense of epic greatness" with its "combination of grandeur and futility."

Cultural impact

Besides the famous Peach Garden Oath, many Chinese proverbs in use today are derived from the novel:

The writing style adopted by Romance of the Three Kingdoms was part of the emergence of written vernacular during the Ming period, as part of the so-called "Four Masterworks" (si da qishu).

Buddhist aspects

Romance of the Three Kingdoms recorded stories of a Buddhist monk called Pujing (普净), who was a friend of Guan Yu. Pujing made his first appearance during Guan's arduous journey of crossing five passes and slaying six generals, in which he warned Guan of an assassination plot. As the novel was written in the Ming dynasty, more than 1,000 years after the era, these stories showed that Buddhism had long been a significant ingredient of the mainstream culture and may not be historically accurate. Luo Guanzhong preserved these descriptions from earlier versions of the novel to support his portrait of Guan as a faithful man of virtue. Guan has since then been respectfully addressed as "Lord Guan" or Guan Gong.

Strategies used in battles
Create Something from Nothing: A strategy to make an audience believe of something's existence, when it in fact does not exist. On the flip side, it can be used to convince others that nothing exists, when something does exist. (Ch. 36)

Beauty Trap: Send the enemy beautiful women to cause disorder at his site. This trick can work in three ways: firstly, the ruler can become so entranced with the feminine allure that he neglects all else. Secondly, the men will start competing for the females' attention, which will cause friction and rifts, and hinders cooperation and eradicates morale. And lastly, other women motivated by jealousy will begin to plot, only worsening the entire situation. Also known as the "Honey Trap". (Ch. 55–56)

Empty City: When the enemy is superior in numbers and you are expecting to be attacked at any moment, drop all pretenses of seeming like you're preparing something militarily and act calm, so the enemy will think twice and will think you're setting a trap or an ambush. It is best used sparingly, and only if one has the military aptitude to do so. It's also best used if one's enemy is an over-thinker. (Ch. 95)

The Jurchen chief and Khan Nurhaci read the Chinese novels Romance of the Three Kingdoms and Water Margin learning all he knew about Chinese military and political strategies from them.

Translations

The book was translated into Manchu as  Möllendorff: ilan gurun-i bithe. During the Qing dynasty, Chinese military manuals were eagerly translated by the Manchus, who were also attracted to the military content in Romance of the Three Kingdoms.

English translations
The Romance of the Three Kingdoms has been translated into English a number of times.

Excerpts and abridgements
The first known translation was performed in 1907 by John G. Steele and consisted of a single chapter excerpt that was distributed in China to students learning English at Presbyterian missionary schools. Herbert A. Giles included an excerpt in his 1923 Gems of Chinese Literature, Z. Q. Parker published a 1925 translation containing four episodes from the novel including the events of the Battle of Red Cliffs, while Yang Xianyi and Gladys Yang published excerpts in 1981, including chapters 43–50. In 1976, Moss Roberts published an abridged translation containing one fourth of the novel including maps and more than 40 woodblock illustrations from three Chinese versions of the novel. Roberts' abridgement is reader-friendly, being written for use in colleges and to be read by the general public.

Unabridged
A complete and faithful translation of the novel was published in two volumes in 1925 by Charles Henry Brewitt-Taylor, a long time official of the Chinese Maritime Customs Service. The translation was well written, but lacked any supplementary materials such as maps or character lists that would aid Western readers; a 1959 reprint was published that included maps and an introduction by Roy Andrew Miller to assist foreign readers.
After decades of work, Moss Roberts published a full translation in 1991 complete with an afterword, eleven maps, a list of characters, titles, terms, and offices, and almost 100 pages of notes from Mao Zonggang's commentaries and other scholarly sources. Roberts' complete translation remains faithful to the original; it is reliable yet still matches the tone and style of the classic text. Yang Ye, a professor in Chinese Literature at the UC Riverside, wrote in Encyclopedia of Literary Translation into English (1998) that Roberts' translation "supersedes Brewitt-Taylor's translation and will no doubt remain the definitive English version for many years to come". Roberts' translation was republished in 1995 by the Foreign Languages Press without the illustrations.
In 2014, Tuttle published a new, three-volume translation of the novel, translated by Yu Sumei and edited by Ronald C. Iverson. According to its publisher, this translation is an unabridged "dynamic translation" intended to be more readable than past English translations of the novel.

Adaptations 

The story of the Romance of the Three Kingdoms has been retold in numerous forms including television series, manga and video games.

See also
 Lists of people of the Three Kingdoms, list of historical people significant to the Three Kingdoms period (220–280)
 List of fictional people of the Three Kingdoms, list of fictional people of the Three Kingdoms period (220–280)
 List of fictitious stories in Romance of the Three Kingdoms
 Timeline of the Three Kingdoms period
 Military history of the Three Kingdoms
 End of the Han dynasty
 Records of the Three Kingdoms, primary historical text on which the novel is based

Citations

References and further reading

 Hsia, Chih-tsing,"The Romance of the Three Kingdoms," in The Classic Chinese Novel: A Critical Introduction (1968) rpr. Cornell East Asia Series. Ithaca, N.Y.: East Asia Program, Cornell University, 1996.

Li Chengli, Zhang Qirong, Wu Jingyu. Romance of the Three Kingdoms (illustrated in English and Chinese) (2008) Asiapac Books. 
 Besio, Kimberly Ann and Constantine Tung, eds., Three Kingdoms and Chinese Culture. Albany: State University of New York Press, 2007. . Essays on this novel's literary aspects, use of history, and in contemporary popular culture.

External links

 Andrew West, The Textual History of Sanguo Yanyi The Mao Zonggang Recension, at Sanguo Yanyi 三國演義. Based on the author's, Quest for the Urtext: The Textual Archaeology of The Three Kingdoms (PhD. Dissertation. Princeton University, 1993), and his 三國演義版本考 (Sanguo Yanyi Banben Kao Study of the Editions of The Romance of the Three Kingdoms) (Shanghai: Shanghai Guji Chubanshe, 1996)
 Andrew West, The Textual History of Sanguo Yanyi: The Manchu Translation.
 Chinese text with embedded Chinese-English dictionary at Chinese Notes
 Bilingual Chinese-English version at the Chinese Text Project

 
14th-century Chinese novels
Historical novels
Ming dynasty novels
Novels set in the Eastern Han
Novels adapted into comics
Chinese novels adapted into films
Novels adapted into video games
Chinese novels adapted into television series
Novels set in Henan
Novels set in Sichuan
Novels set in Jiangsu
Novels set in Hubei
Novels set in Shaanxi
Novels set in Shandong
Novels set in Hebei
Novels set in Jiangxi
Novels set in Hunan
Novels set in Chongqing
Novels set in the 2nd century
Novels set in the 3rd century